= List of squadrons of the RNZAF =

This is a list of past and present squadrons of the Royal New Zealand Air Force

== Current RNZAF flying squadrons and units ==
Squadron / Unit	Code	Primary focus	Aircraft used	Notes
3 Squadron	JV	Utility Helicopter	NH90, A-109	Formerly Patrol Bomber / Territorial Fighter Bomber & Transport
5 Squadron	PA & KN	Maritime Patrol	Boeing P-8 Poseidon	Formerly Reconnaissance / Flying Boat
6 Squadron	XX	Shipboard Helicopter	Kaman SH-2G(NZ) Seasprite	Formerly Army Co-operation / Flying Boat
14 Squadron	HQ & AZ	Primary and Advanced Trainer	Beechcraft T-6 Texan II	Aircraft shared with Central Flying School
40 Squadron		Transport	Lockheed C-130J Super Hercules and Boeing 757-200	
42 Squadron		Training/VIP	Beechcraft King Air 350	Formerly Reserve Light Bomber / Communications / Transport
62 Squadron		Space defence & international security	N/A	
230 Squadron		Intelligence and information systems support	N/A	Created through combining the Communication and Information Systems functions of 209 Squadron and the Intelligence functions from the Integrated Mission Support Squadron
Central Flying School		Flight Instructor Training	Beechcraft T-6 Texan II	Aircraft shared with 14 Squadron

== Former RNZAF squadrons ==
- No. 1 Squadron RNZAF Code "SJ" reconnaissance / patrol bomber / Territorial Fighter Bomber / Transport
- No. 2 Squadron RNZAF Code "UH" reconnaissance / patrol bomber / Territorial Fighter Bomber / Attack
- No. 4 Squadron RNZAF Code "YZ" reconnaissance / patrol bomber / Territorial Fighter Bomber / Transport
- No. 7 Squadron RNZAF Code "UW" reconnaissance / patrol bomber
- No. 8 Squadron RNZAF Code "PA" reconnaissance / patrol bomber
- No. 9 Squadron RNZAF – reconnaissance / patrol bomber
- No. 10 Squadron RNZAF – reserve bomber reconnaissance / reconnaissance /patrol bomber / Operational Training Unit
- No. 11 Squadron RNZAF – reserve bomber reconnaissance
- No. 12 Squadron RNZAF – reserve bomber reconnaissance
- No. 13 Squadron RNZAF – reserve bomber reconnaissance
- No. 15 Squadron RNZAF Code "JZ" Fighter
- No. 16 Squadron RNZAF Code "XO" Fighter
- No. 17 Squadron RNZAF – Fighter
- No. 18 Squadron RNZAF – Fighter
- No. 19 Squadron RNZAF – Code "ZG" Fighter
- No. 20 Squadron RNZAF – Code "UY" Army Co-operation / Fighter
- No. 21 Squadron RNZAF – Code "TX" Army Co-operation / Fighter
- No. 22 Squadron RNZAF – Code Army Co-operation/ Fighter
- No. 23 Squadron RNZAF – Fighter
- No. 24 Squadron RNZAF – Fighter
- No. 25 Squadron RNZAF - Dive Bomber / Fighter
- No. 26 Squadron RNZAF - Fighter
- No. 30 Squadron RNZAF - Reserve Fighter Bomber / Dive Bomber
- No. 31 Squadron RNZAF - Reserve Fighter Bomber / Dive Bomber
- No. 41 Squadron RNZAF - Code "SG" Reserve Light Bomber / Transport
- No. 43 Squadron RNZAF – Reserve Light Bomber
- No. 44 Squadron RNZAF - Reserve Light Bomber
- No. 51 Squadron RNZAF – postwar Light Anti-Aircraft (LAA) unit. Previous No. 1 LAA Squadron; change of title c.1954.
- No. 52 Squadron RNZAF – postwar Light Anti-Aircraft (LAA) unit. Previously No. 2 LAA Squadron.
- No. 60 Squadron RNZAF - Radar
- No. 61 Squadron RNZAF - Radar
- No. 75 Squadron RNZAF Code "AA", "JN" & "YC" Fighter / Bomber / Heavy Bomber / Fighter Bomber
- No. 209 (Expeditionary Support) Squadron RNZAF - support squadron
- Navigation and Air Electronics Training Squadron RNZAF
- Airframe Reconditioning Squadron RNZAF (RNZAF Base Woodbourne)

== Squadrons of the Royal Air Force staffed mainly by New Zealanders ==
- 75 (NZ) Squadron RAF – heavy bomber; code "AA" & "JN"
- No. 243 Squadron RAF – fighter/transport; code "SN" & "VM"
- No. 258 Squadron RAF – fighter; code "FH" & "ZT"

== Article XV squadrons ==
- 485 Squadron – fighter; code "OU"
- 486 Squadron – night fighter & fighter bomber; code "SA"
- 487 Squadron – bomber/fighter bomber; code "EG"
- 488 Squadron – fighter/night fighter; code "NF" & "ME"
- 489 Squadron – torpedo bomber; code "XA", "1" & "P6"
- 490 Squadron – flying boats; code/s unknown

== Other RNZAF units ==
- Northern Group, Central Group, Southern Group (in New Zealand)
- No. 1 (Islands) Group RNZAF
- General Service Training School
- Command Training School
- Ground Training Wing

== World War II ==
=== Wartime squadrons ===
Squadron(s)	Role(s)	Aircraft Type(s)
No. 1 Squadron RNZAF	Reconnaissance	Vickers Vincent, Vickers Vildebeest, Airspeed Oxford, Lockheed Hudson, Lockheed Ventura
No. 2 Squadron RNZAF	Reconnaissance	Vickers Vincent, Vickers Vildebeest, De Havilland Express, Airspeed Oxford, Lockheed Hudson, Lockheed Ventura
No. 3 Squadron RNZAF	Reconnaissance	Blackburn Baffin, Vickers Vincent, Vickers Vildebeest, Airspeed Oxford, Lockheed Hudson, Lockheed Ventura
No. 4 Squadron RNZAF	Reconnaissance	De Havilland Express, De Havilland Dragon Rapide, Vickers Vincent, Lockheed Hudson, Lockheed Ventura
No. 5 Squadron RNZAF	Reconnaissance Close air support Maritime patrol	Short Singapore, Vickers Vincent, Consolidated PBY Catalina
No. 6 Squadron RNZAF	Close air support Maritime patrol	Hawker Hind, North American Harvard, Consolidated PBY Catalina
No. 7 Squadron RNZAF	Reconnaissance	Vickers Vincent, Vickers Vildebeest
No. 8 Squadron RNZAF	Reconnaissance	Vickers Vincent, Vickers Vildebeest, Airspeed Oxford, North American Harvard, Lockheed Ventura
No. 9 Squadron RNZAF	Reconnaissance	Lockheed Hudson, Lockheed Ventura
No. 10 Squadron RNZAF	Reconnaissance	Airspeed Oxford, Lockheed Hudson
No. 14 Squadron RNZAF	Fighter	Curtiss Warhawk, Vought Corsair
No. 15 Squadron RNZAF	Fighter	Curtiss Warhawk, Vought Corsair
No. 16 Squadron RNZAF	Fighter	Curtiss Warhawk, Vought Corsair
No. 17 Squadron RNZAF	Fighter	Curtiss Warhawk, Vought Corsair
No. 18 Squadron RNZAF	Fighter	Curtiss Warhawk, Vought Corsair
No. 19 Squadron RNZAF	Fighter	Curtiss Warhawk, Vought Corsair
No. 20 Squadron RNZAF No. 21 Squadron RNZAF	Close air support Fighter	Hawker Hind, North American Harvard, Curtiss Warhawk, Vought Corsair
No. 22 Squadron RNZAF	Close air support Fighter	Vickers Vincent, North American Harvard, Curtiss Warhawk, Vought Corsair
No. 23 Squadron RNZAF No. 24 Squadron RNZAF	Fighter	Vought F-4U Corsair
No. 25 Squadron RNZAF	Fighter-bomber	North American Harvard, Douglas SBD Dauntless, Vought Corsair
No. 26 Squadron RNZAF	Fighter-bomber	Douglas SBD Dauntless, Vought Corsair
No. 30 Squadron RNZAF	Fighter-bomber	Vickers Vincent, North American Harvard, Grumman TBF Avenger
No. 31 Squadron RNZAF	Fighter-bomber	North American Harvard, Grumman TBF Avenger
No. 40 Squadron RNZAF No. 41 Squadron RNZAF	Transport	Lockheed Lodestar, Douglas Dakota, Lockheed Hudson
No. 42 Squadron RNZAF	Command and Control	De Havilland Domine

=== New Zealand Embedded Squadrons in the Royal Air Force ===
Squadron(s)	Role(s)	Aircraft Type(s)
No. 75 Squadron RAF	Bomber	Vickers Wellington, Short Stirling, Avro Lancaster
No. 485 Squadron RAF	Fighter	Supermarine Spitfire, Hawker Tempest
No. 486 Squadron RAF	Fighter-bomber	Hawker Hurricane, Hawker Typhoon, Hawker Tempest
No. 487 Squadron RAF	Fighter-bomber	Lockheed Ventura, De Havilland Mosquito
No. 488 Squadron RAF	Fighter Night fighter	Brewster Buffalo, Hawker Hurricane Bristol Beaufighter, De Havilland Mosquito
No. 489 Squadron RAF	Torpedo Bomber	Bristol Beaufort, Bristol Blenheim, Handley Page Hampden, Bristol Beaufighter, De Havilland Mosquito
No. 490 Squadron RAF	Maritime Patrol	Consolidated PBY Catalina, Short Sunderland

== See also ==
- Structure of the Royal New Zealand Air Force
