= List of aircraft of the Royal New Zealand Air Force and Royal New Zealand Navy =

This is a list of aircraft of the Royal New Zealand Air Force and Royal New Zealand Navy.

== Aircraft ==
Name	Variants	Number	Origin	Role	Introduced	Retired	Notes	Serial numbers
Aermacchi MB-339	MB-339CB	18	Italy	Two-seat advanced pilot, weapons trainer aircraft	1991	2001	Operated by No. 14 Squadron RNZAF and the Black Falcons aerobatic team.	NZ6460 - 6477
AESL Airtourer	T.6/24	4	New Zealand	Two-seat elementary pilot trainer, aircraft	1970	1995	Operated by the Pilot Training Squadron RNZAF. See also CT4.	NZ1760 - 1763
AgustaWestland A109	A109 LUH	6	Italy	Light utility helicopter	2011		Current, operated by No. 3 Squadron. Ordered in 2007 (one used for spares).	NZ3401 - 3406
Aichi E13A Jake	E13A1A	1	Empire of Japan	Captured enemy aircraft	1945	1945	Captured in Rabaul in 1945, flown in theatre.	
Airspeed Consul		6	United Kingdom	Twin-engine light transport aircraft	1948	1952	Operated by No. 42 Squadron RNZAF. Converted from Oxfords.	NZ1901 - 1906
Airspeed Oxford	Mk I, II	229	United Kingdom	Multi-engine pilot trainer, crew trainer aircraft	1938	1952	Operated by No. 14 Squadron RNZAF and No. 42 Squadron RNZAF	NZ250 - 290, NZ1201 - 1399, NZ2100 - 2157, R6226
Avro 504	504K	12	United Kingdom	Two-seat pilot trainer biplane	1920	1930	New purchases in 1925, others were Imperial Gift aircraft, loaned to private companies 1920–1923 or 24. Some lost in accidents while on loan.	E3137, E4153, H1964 - H1966, 201 -206
Avro 626 Perfect	626	4	United Kingdom	Three-seat advanced pilot trainer, crew trainer biplane	1935	1943		NZ201 - 204
Avro Anson	652A, Mk I, Mk XII	25	United Kingdom	Twin-engine navigation, radio research, VIP transport aircraft	1942	1952	Two Anson Mk XIIs were used by the British High Commission for VIP transport. Two Anson XIIs were hired or on loan from the RAF. Used by the British High Commission in New Zealand for VIP transport.	NZ401 - 423, PH599, PH600
Avro Lancaster	Mk I, Mk III		United Kingdom	Four-engine heavy bomber aircraft	1943	1945	RAF aircraft operated by No. 75 Squadron RAF. RAF variants were Lancaster Mk I and Mk III.	
Avro Lincoln	Mk II		United Kingdom	Four-engine heavy long range bomber aircraft	1945	1945	RAF aircraft operated by No. 75 Squadron RAF. RAF variant was the Lincoln Mk II.	
Auster J/5, Auster T Mk 7C Antarctic	J/5, T Mk 7C	7	United Kingdom	Three-seat light utility, army observation, forestry, patrol, communications aircraft	1947	1969	The Austers were operated by No. 3 Squadron RNZAF, No. 6 Squadron RNZAF and No. 42 Squadron RNZAF. The Auster T Mk 7C was acquired for use in the Antarctic.	NZ1701 - 1707
BAC Strikemaster	BAC 167, Mk 88	16	United Kingdom	Two-seat advanced pilot trainer, light attack aircraft	1972	1991	Operated by No. 14 Squadron RNZAF.	NZ6361 - 6376
Beechcraft 17	C-17L Staggerwing	1	United States	Single-engine cabin biplane	1939	1946	One civilian aircraft was impressed into RNZAF service in 1939. Used for communications.	NZ573
Beechcraft King Air	King Air 200	9	United States		1998	2018	Operated by No. 42 Squadron	NZ1881 - 1885, NZ7121 - 7124
Beechcraft Super King Air	King Air 350	4	United States	Twin-engine multi-engine trainer	2018		Current, operated by No. 42 Squadron RNZAF	NZ2350 - 2353
Beechcraft T-6 Texan II	T-6C	11	United States	Two-seat pilot trainer aircraft	2014		Current, operated by No. 14 Squadron RNZAF, Central Flying School RNZAF and the Black Falcons aerobatic team.	NZ1401 - 1411
Bell H-13 Sioux	47G-3B-1, 47G-3B-2	13	United States	Army observation, pilot trainer, light utility helicopter	1965	2010	Operated by No. 3 Squadron RNZAF	NZ3701 - 3713
Bell UH-1 Iroquois	UH-1D, UH-1H	18	United States	Utility transport helicopter	1966	2015	Operated by No. 3 Squadron RNZAF and No. 41 Squadron RNZAF. The UH-1 Iroquois were used for casualty evacuation, search and rescue, supply and troop transport. Plus an unknown number of aircraft leased for UN work in the Sinai. One UH-1H was donated for display at the Wigram museum, and never saw service. The UH-1Ds were converted to UH-1H standard. Two helicopters were leased from the US Army in 1982. Used by the United Nations, Multinational Force and Observers peacekeeping force in the Sinai Peninsula.	NZ3801 - 3816, 66–0809, 66-16450
Blackburn Baffin		29	United Kingdom	Two-seat general reconnaissance biplane	1937	1942	Designed as a torpedo bomber, but the torpedo gear was not fitted. The Baffins were operated by No. 1 Squadron RNZAF, No. 2 Squadron RNZAF and No. 3 Squadron RNZAF	NZ150 - 178
Bleriot XI-2		1	France	Two-seat general purpose aircraft	1913	1914	New Zealand's first military aircraft. A replica is on display in the Air Force Museum, Wigram, Christchurch.	"Britannia"
Boeing 727	727-22QC	3	United States	Three-engine long range transport aircraft.	1981	2003	Operated by No. 40 Squadron RNZAF. NZ7271 & NZ7272 entered service, while NZ7273 was used as an attrition airframe.	NZ7271 - 7273
Boeing 757	757-200	2	United States	Transport aircraft	2003		Current, operated by No. 40 Squadron RNZAF	NZ7571 - 7572
Boeing P-8 Poseidon	P-8A	4	United States	Two-engine maritime reconnaissance aircraft.	2022		Flown by No. 5 Squadron RNZAF, replacing the Lockheed P-3 Orion.	NZ4801 - 4804
Brewster Buffalo	Buffalo Mk I	23	United States	Single-seat fighter aircraft	1941	1942	Operated by 488 (NZ) Squadron in the defence of Singapore. 23 aircraft hired or on loan from the RAF.	
Bristol Beaufighter			United Kingdom	Twin engine night fighter, torpedo fighter aircraft	1942	1945	RAF aircraft were operated by 488 (NZ) and 489 (NZ) Squadrons. The RAF Variants were the Beaufighter Mk IIF, MK VIF and TF Mk X	
Bristol Beaufort			United Kingdom	Twin engine torpedo bomber, reconnaissance aircraft	1941	1942	RAF aircraft were operated by 489 (NZ) Squadron. The RAF variant was the Beaufort Mk I	
Bristol Blenheim			United Kingdom	Twin-engine long range fighter aircraft	1942	1942	RAF aircraft were operated by 489 (NZ) Squadron. The RAF variant was the Blenheim Mk IVF.	
Bristol F2B Fighter	F2B fighter	7	United Kingdom	Two-seat general-purpose biplane	1919	1938	Imperial Gift aircraft. Operated as army co-operation, advanced trainers and aerial survey aircraft.	H1557 - H1558, H6856 - H6857, H7120 - H7122
Bristol Type 170 Freighter	Mk 31(NZ)M	12	United Kingdom	Twin-engine medium-range tactical transport aircraft	1951	1977	The Bristol Freighters were operated by No. 1 Squadron RNZAF, No. 3 Squadron RNZAF and No. 41 Squadron RNZAF	NZ5901 - 5912
British Aircraft Swallow	Swallow II	1	United Kingdom	Two-seat light aircraft	1939	1940	One civilian aircraft was impressed into RNZAF service in 1939. See Mount Cook Airline	NZ583
Cessna 421C Golden Eagle	421C	3	United States	Twin-engine light passenger, VIP transport aircraft	1981	1990	Operated by No. 42 Squadron RNZAF.	NZ7940 - 7942
Consolidated PBY Catalina	PBY-5, PB2B-1	56	United States	Twin-engine maritime reconnaissance, air sea rescue flying boat	1943	1953	Used for long-range anti-submarine and maritime reconnaissance patrols. The Catalinas were operated by No. 5 Squadron RNZAF and No. 6 Squadron RNZAF in New Zealand and the South Pacific. RAF aircraft were operated by 490 (NZ) Squadron from 1943 to 1944. The RAF variant was the Catalina Mk IB. See Consolidated PBY Catalina in New Zealand service	NZ4001 - 4056
Curtiss P-40 Kittyhawk	P-40E, P-40K, P-40L, P-40M, P-40N	301	United States	Single-seat fighter, fighter bomber aircraft	1942	1946	The Kittyhawk and Warhawks were operated by Nos 14, 15, 16, 17, 18, 19, 20, 21 and 22 Squadrons in New Zealand and the South Pacific. Total includes four lost on delivery.	NZ3001 - 3293
de Havilland DH.4		2	United Kingdom	Two-seat advanced pilot trainer biplane	1919	1929	Imperial Gift aircraft.	A7893, A7929
de Havilland DH.9		3	United Kingdom	Two-seat advanced pilot trainer biplane	1923	1929	Imperial Gift aircraft. On loan to private companies 1921–23	D3136, D3139, H5636
de Havilland DH.50	DH.50A	1	United Kingdom	Five-seat aerial survey, communications, transport biplane	1927	1930	Five-seat communications aircraft	135
de Havilland DH.60 Moth	DH.60G, DH.60M	28	United Kingdom	Two elementary pilot trainer, utility biplane.	1929	1943		870 - 873, 995, 1560, 1567, NZ501 - 522
de Havilland DH.80 Puss Moth	DH.80A	4	United Kingdom	Three-seat aerial survey, utility aircraft	1931	1936		2125, NZ567, NZ582, NZ590, NZ593 - 594
de Havilland DH.80 Puss Moth	DH.80A	4	United Kingdom	Three-seat aerial survey, utility aircraft	1939	1946		2125, NZ567, NZ582, NZ590, NZ593 - 594
de Havilland DH.82 Tiger Moth	DH.82A, Mk II	335	United Kingdom / New Zealand	Two-seat elementary pilot trainer biplane	1939	1956	The Tiger Moths were operated by No. 1 Squadron RNZAF, No. 2 Squadron RNZAF, No. 3 Squadron RNZAF, No. 4 Squadron RNZAF and No. 42 Squadron RNZAF.	NZ650 - 689, NZ701 - 724, NZ730 - 749, NZ751 - 900, NZ1401 - 1500
de Havilland DH.83 Fox Moth	DH.83	1	United Kingdom	Four-seat cabin biplane.	1943	1948	One civilian aircraft was impressed into RNZAF service in 1943. Impressed from Air Travel (NZ) Ltd in 1943, used for communications.	NZ566
de Havilland DH.84 Dragon	DH.84 Dragon II	2	United Kingdom	Twin-engine radio and navigation trainer, transport biplane	1939	1943	Two civilian aircraft were impressed into RNZAF service in 1939. Impressed from Union Airways of New Zealand in 1939.	NZ550 - 551
de Havilland DH.86 Express	DH.86	3	United Kingdom	Four-engine navigation trainer, reconnaissance, transport biplane	1939	1943	Three civilian aircraft were impressed into RNZAF service. The aircraft were operated by No. 4 Squadron RNZAF and No. 42 Squadron RNZAF. Impressed from Union Airways of New Zealand in 1939.	NZ552 - 554
de Havilland DH.86 Express	DH.86	3	United Kingdom	Four-engine navigation trainer, reconnaissance, transport biplane	1945	1946	Three civilian aircraft were impressed into RNZAF service. The aircraft were operated by No. 4 Squadron RNZAF and No. 42 Squadron RNZAF. Impressed from Union Airways of New Zealand in 1939.	NZ552 - 554
de Havilland DH.89 Dragon Rapide	DH.89, DH.89A Dragon Rapide, DH.89B Dominie II	14	United Kingdom	Twin-engine navigation trainer, reconnaissance, transport biplane	1939	1953	Also known as the Dominie. The aircraft were operated by No. 4 Squadron RNZAF and No. 42 Squadron RNZAF	NZ523 - 531, NZ555 - 559
de Havilland DH.94 Moth Minor	DH.94	5	United Kingdom	Two-seat trainer, communications aircraft	1940	1946	Five civilian aircraft were Impressed into RNZAF service in 1940.	NZ591 - 592, NZ595 - 597
de Havilland DH.98 Mosquito	FB 6, FB 40, T 3, T 43	89	United Kingdom	Two-seat twin-engine fighter bomber aircraft.	1943	1955	Four lost during delivery. The Mosquitos were operated by Nos 14, 75, 487, 488 and 489 (NZ) Squadrons. RAF variants were the Mosquito FB Mk VI fighter bomber, NF Mk XII, NF Mk XIII, NF Mk 30 night fighters and T Mk III trainers.	NZ2301 - 2308, NZ2320 - 2396
de Havilland DH.104 Devon / Dove	DH.104	30	United Kingdom	Twin-engine light transport, pilot, navigation and radio trainer aircraft	1948	1981	Operated by No. 42 Squadron RNZAF	NZ1801 - 1830
de Havilland DH.110/DH.115 Vampire	FB 5, FB 52, T 11, T 55	63	United Kingdom	Single-seat fighter bomber aircraft. Two-seat advanced pilot trainer, instrument continuation trainer aircraft.	1951	1972	The RNZAF's first operational jet aircraft. The Vampires were operated by No. 14 Squadron RNZAF and No. 75 Squadron RNZAF.	NZ5701 - 5711, NZ5721 - 5738, NZ570 - 5778, INST166, 167, 170, 171, WZ516
de Havilland DH.110/DH.115 Vampire	FB 9, T 11	63	United Kingdom	Single-seat fighter-bomber aircraft. Two-seat continuation trainer aircraft.	1952	1958	The RNZAF's first operational jet aircraft. The Vampires were operated by No. 14 Squadron RNZAF and No. 75 Squadron RNZAF.	NZ5701 - 5711, NZ5721 - 5738, NZ570 - 5778, INST166, 167, 170, 171, WZ516
de Havilland DH. 112 Venom	FB 1	48	United Kingdom	Single-seat fighter bomber aircraft	1955	1958	The aircraft were hired or on loan from the RAF. The Venoms were operated by No. 14 Squadron in Singapore, they saw action during the Malayan Emergency.	
de Havilland Canada DHC-2 Beaver	DHC-2	1	Canada	Single engine light transport aircraft	1956	1960	Acquired for use in Antarctic.	NZ6010
de Havilland Canada DHC-3 Otter	DHC-3	1	Canada	Single-engine light transport aircraft	1960	1963	Acquired for use in Antarctic.	NZ6081
Douglas DC-6	DC-6	3	United States	Four-engine long range transport aircraft	1961	1968	Three ex-TEAL aircraft, operated by No. 40 Squadron RNZAF.	NZ3631 - 3633
Douglas A-20 Boston			United States		1942	1943	RAF aircraft loaned to 487 (NZ) Squadron.	
Douglas C-47 Dakota	C-47, C-47A, C-47B	49	United States	Twin engine medium range transport, VIP transport, target tug aircraft	1943	1977	The Dakotas were operated by No. 40 Squadron RNZAF, No. 41 Squadron RNZAF and No. 42 Squadron RNZAF. Used as a transport, target tug, paratroop and VIP transport aircraft.	NZ3501 - 3506, NZ3516 - 3558
Douglas SBD Dauntless	SBD-3, SBD-4, SBD-5	69	United States	Two-seat dive bomber aircraft	1943	1944	Operated by No. 25 Squadron RNZAF in the South Pacific. Total includes one lost on delivery. See Douglas SBD Dauntless in New Zealand service	NZ5001 - 5068
English Electric Canberra	B(I).12, T.13	13	United Kingdom	Twin-engine strike bomber aircraft Twin-engine type conversion trainer aircraft	1959	1970	The Canberras were operated by No. 14 Squadron RNZAF and No. 75 Squadron RNZAF.	NZ6101 - 6111, NZ6151 - 6152
English Electric Canberra	B.2, T.4	15	United Kingdom	Twin-engine medium-bomber aircraft Twin-engine type conversion trainer aircraft	1958	1962	Hired or on loan from the RAF. Operated by No. 75 Squadron in Singapore.	WD963, WJ859, WJ864,
Fairey III	IIIF, Mk IIIM, Mk IIIB	3	United Kingdom	Two or three-seat bomber, general purpose biplane Naval co-operation floatplane	1929	1939		F1133 - 1134, S1805
Fairey Battle	Mk I	1	United Kingdom	Ground-based instructional airframe	1941		Ex-RAF	K9177
Fairey Firefly	Mk I	1	United Kingdom	Ground-based instructional airframe			Ex-Royal Navy	
Fairey Gordon	Mk I, Mk II	41	United Kingdom	Two-seat bomber, advanced pilot trainer, target tug biplane	1939	1943		NZ601 - 641
Fokker Friendship	F27-120	3	Netherlands	Twin-engine navigation, radio and electronic trainer, maritime reconnaissance aircraft.	1980	1992	Three ex-Air New Zealand aircraft. Operated by the Navigation and Air Electronics Training Squadron RNZAF. See Air New Zealand fleet	NZ2781 - 2783
Foster Wikner Wicko	GM.1	1	United Kingdom	Two-seat light cabin aircraft.	1939	1942	One civilian aircraft was impressed into RNZAF service in 1939.	NZ580
General Aircraft Monospar ST-25 Jubilee	ST-25	1	United Kingdom	Twin-engine light cabin aircraft	1939	1941	One civilian aircraft was impressed into RNZAF service in 1939. Used for communications.	NZ584
Gloster Grebe		3	United Kingdom	Single-seat fighter biplane Two-seat advanced trainer biplane	1928	1938	Later used as instructional airframes broken up 1943–44	NZ501 - 503
Gloster Meteor	F.III	1	United Kingdom	Single-seat jet fighter aircraft.	1945	1950	The Meteor F.III was presented to the RNZAF by the RAF in 1945.	NZ6001
Gloster Meteor	T.7	2	United Kingdom	Two-seat instrument continuation trainer aircraft	1952	1955	Two T.7 aircraft were hired from the RAF. They were operated No. 14 Squadron RNZAF in Cyprus.	WH206, WL400
Grumman TBM Avenger	TBF-1, TBF-1C	48	United States	Two-seat light bomber, target tug, topdressing aircraft	1943	1959	The Avengers were operated by No 30, 31, 41, 42 Squadrons in New Zealand and the South Pacific. Used for top dressing trials in 1948.	NZ2501 - 2548
Handley Page HP.52 Hampden			United Kingdom	Twin-engine medium bomber aircraft	1942	1943	RAF aircraft used by 489 (NZ) Squadron. The RAF variant was the Hampden Mk I.	
Handley Page HP.67 Hastings	C.3	4	United Kingdom	Four-engine long range transport aircraft	1952	1965	The RNZAF's first long-range aircraft, operated by No. 40 Squadron RNZAF and No. 41 Squadron RNZAF	NZ5801 - 5804
Hawker Siddeley HS 780 Andover	C.1	10	United Kingdom	Twin-engine medium-range tactical transport, VIP transport aircraft	1976	1998	Ten ex-RAF aircraft. Operated by No. 1 Squadron RNZAF, later No. 42 Squadron RNZAF	NZ7620 -27629
Hawker Hind	Hind, Hind Trainer	63	United Kingdom	Two-seat army co-operation, advanced pilot trainer biplane	1940	1943	Only 63 actually received, 15 lost at sea due to enemy action in 1940. Operated by No. 22 Squadron RNZAF	NZ1501 - 1563
Hawker Hurricane	Mk IIB	9	United Kingdom	Single-seat fighter aircraft	1942	1942	Additional aircraft were operated by 486 and 488 Squadrons; Apparently 75 Squadron also received at least one Hurricane as a hack – a pilot was posted as missing presumed killed while flying it. The RAF variants were the Hurricane Mk I, Mk IIA and Mk IIB. Nine aircraft were hired or on loan from the RAF.	
Hawker Tempest	Mk V		United Kingdom	Single-seat fighter, fighter bomber aircraft	1944	1945	RAF aircraft were operated by 486 (NZ) Squadron. The RAF variant was the Tempest Mk V.	
Hawker Tomtit		4	United Kingdom	Two-seat elementary, intermediate pilot trainer biplane	1931	1939		50 - 53
Hawker Typhoon			United Kingdom	Single-seat fighter bomber, ground attack aircraft	1942	1944	RAF aircraft were operated by 486 (NZ) Squadron. The RAF variant was the Typhoon Mk IB.	
Kaman SH-2 Seasprite	SH-2F	15	United States	Anti-submarine naval helicopter	1997	2016	4 SH-2F, 5 SH-2G(NZ) formerly operated by No. 6 Squadron RNZAF, 6 SH-2F purchased for use as instructional airframes only	NZ3441 - 3444, NZ3601 - 3605, 0231G - 0236G
Kaman SH-2 Super Seasprite	SH-2G(I)	10	United States	Anti-submarine naval helicopter	2015		Current, operated by No. 6 Squadron RNZAF.	NZ3611 - 3620
Lockheed C-130 Hercules	C-130H, C-130H(NZ)	5	United States	Four engine medium/long-range, tactical transport aircraft	1965	2025	Operated by No. 40 Squadron RNZAF. Replaced with C-130J-30	NZ7001 - 7005
C-130J Super Hercules	C-130J-30	5	United States	Four engine medium/long-range, tactical transport aircraft	2024		In June 2020, the New Zealand government announced that five C-130J-30 would be purchased to replace the C-130H(NZ) aircraft. Current, operated by No. 40 Squadron RNZAF.	
Lockheed Hudson	Mk III, Mk IIIA, Mk V, Mk VI	94	United States	Twin-engine general reconnaissance bomber, trainer, target tug aircraft.	1941	1948	The Hudsons were operated by Nos 1, 2, 3, 4, 9, 40, 41 and 42 Squadrons in New Zealand and the South Pacific.	NZ2001 - 2094
Lockheed C-60 Lodestar	C-60A	9	United States	Twin-engine medium-range transport aircraft.	1943	1949	The Lodestars were operated by No. 40 Squadron RNZAF and No. 41 Squadron RNZAF	NZ3507 - 3515
Lockheed PV-2 Harpoon	PV-2	4	United States	Twin-engine medium-range transport aircraft.	1943	1949	The Lodestars were operated by No. 40 Squadron RNZAF and No. 41 Squadron RNZAF	NZ3507 - 3515
Lockheed P-3 Orion	P-3B, P-3K, P-3K2	6	United States	Four-engine maritime reconnaissance aircraft.	1966	2023	Flown by No. 5 Squadron RNZAF. Replaced by P-8 Poseidons	NZ4201 - 4206
Lockheed Ventura	PV-1 Ventura, B-34 Lexington	139	United States	Twin-engine general reconnaissance bomber aircraft.	1943	1946	The Aircraft were operated by Nos. 1 2, 3, 4, 8, 9 Squadrons in New Zealand and South Pacific. RAF aircraft were operated by 487 (NZ) Squadron from 1942 to 1943. RAF variants were the Ventura Mk I and II. See also Harpoon.	NZ4501 - 4639
McDonnell Douglas A-4 Skyhawk	A-4G, TA-4G, A-4K, TA-4K	24	United States	Single-seat jet fighter, ground attack, maritime strike aircraft. Two-seat conversion trainer aircraft.	1970	2001	The Skyhawks were operated by No. 2 Squadron RNZAF No. 14 Squadron RNZAF and No. 75 Squadron RNZAF. See Douglas A-4 Skyhawk in New Zealand service	NZ6201 - 6218, NZ6251 - 6256
Messerschmitt Bf 109	E4	1	Nazi Germany	Captured enemy fighter aircraft	1940	1944	Captured in Europe, shipped from the United Kingdom to New Zealand, used for fund raising purposes, display and technical training.	INST111
Miles M.2 Hawk	M.2F, M.2H, M.2P Hawk Major	4	United Kingdom	Two-seat light aircraft	1939	1943	Four civilian aircraft were impressed into RNZAF service in 1939. Used for Training and communications.	NZ578, NZ587 - 589,
Miles M.11 Whitney Straight	M.11A	3	United Kingdom	Two-seat light cabin aircraft	1939	1946	Three civilian aircraft were impressed into RNZAF service in 1939.	NZ576 - 577, NZ579
Miles M.14 Magister	M.14A	2	United Kingdom	Two-seat elementary trainer aircraft	1939	1946	Two civilian aircraft were impressed into RNZAF service in 1939.	NZ585 - 586
Miles M.57 Aerovan		2	United Kingdom	Twin-engine topdressing, magnetic survey aircraft.	1949	1950	Used for topdressing trails.	NZ1751 - 1752
Mitsubishi Ki-46 Dinah	Ki-46-II	1	Empire of Japan	Captured enemy aircraft	1945	1945	Captured in Rabaul in 1945.	
Mitsubishi A6M Zero	A6M3, A6M5 "Zeke"	3	Empire of Japan	Captured enemy fighter aircraft.	1945	1945	One was captured in Bougainville Island in 1945. Flown by RNZAF pilots, shipped back to New Zealand. The aircraft is on display at the Auckland War Memorial Museum.	NZ6000, INST113
Mitsubishi MU-2		4	Japan		2009		Used as an instructional airframes	0222G - 0225G
NHIndustries NH90		8	NATO	Medium utility transport helicopter	2012		Current, operated by No. 3 Squadron RNZAF. Deliveries started 2012	NZ3301 - 3309
Nakajima B5N Kate	B5N2	1	Empire of Japan	Captured enemy aircraft	1945	1945	Captured in Rabaul, flown in theatre in 1945.	
North American T-6 Harvard	Mk II, IIA, IIB, III	202	United States	Two-seat advanced pilot trainer aircraft	1941	1977	Later used as an elementary training aircraft. The aircraft were operated by Nos 1 2, 3, 4, 14, 15, 16, 17, 18, 19, 42 Squadrons, and the Red Checkers aerobatic team.	NZ901 - 1102
North American T-6 Harvard		2	United States	Two-seat advanced trainer aircraft	1946	1948	Hired or on loan from the RAF. Two aircraft were operated by No. 14 Squadron in Japan between 1946 - 1948.	KF 113
North American P-51 Mustang	P-51D (Mustang Mk III)	30	United States	Single-seat fighter, fighter bomber aircraft.	1945	1957	In storage from 1945 to 1951. The Mustangs were operated by No. 1 Squadron RNZAF, No. 2 Squadron RNZAF, No. 3 Squadron RNZAF, No. 4 Squadron RNZAF and No. 42 Squadron RNZAF. See North American P-51 Mustang in New Zealand service	NZ2401 - 2430
Pacific Aerospace Corporation CT/4 Airtrainer	CT/4B, CT/4E	32	New Zealand	Two-seat basic pilot trainer, aerobatic aircraft	1976	2014	Bought by the RNZAF as a replacement for the North American Harvard. Operated by the Central Flying School RNZAF, Pilot Training Squadron RNZAF and the Red Checkers aerobatic team.	NZ1930 - NZ1948, NZ1985 - 1997
Percival Gull Four	Gull Four	1	United Kingdom	Utility aircraft	1939	1940	One civilian aircraft was impressed into RNZAF service in 1939.	NZ572
Percival Vega Gull	P.10 Vega Gull	1	United Kingdom	Three-seat light cabin aircraft	1939	1946	One civilian aircraft was impressed into RNZAF service in 1939.	NZ571
Porterfield Model 35 Flyabout	Model 35W	1	United States	Two-seat light cabin aircraft	1939	1946	One civilian aircraft was impressed into RNZAF service in 1939.	NZ581/NZ598
Rearwin 9000 Sportster	9000L KR Sportster	4	United States	Two-seat light cabin aircraft	1940	1940	Four civilian aircraft were impressed into RNZAF service.	NZ565, 568, 569, 599
Rearwin 9000 Sportster	9000L KR Sportster	4	United States	Two-seat light cabin aircraft	1942	1946	Four civilian aircraft were impressed into RNZAF service.	NZ565, 568, 569, 599
Robinson Redwing	II	1	United Kingdom	Ground-based instructional airframe	1941	1946		INST 112
Saro A-17 Cutty Sark	A-17M	1	United Kingdom	Twin-engine utility transport, trainer, communications flying boat.	1930	1936		L3
Short Singapore	Mk III	4	United Kingdom	Four-engine maritime reconnaissance flying boat	1941	1943	Operated by No. 5 Squadron RNZAF	K6912, K6916 - 6918
Short Stirling			United Kingdom	Four-engine heavy bomber aircraft	1942	1943		RAF aircraft were operated by 75 (NZ) Squadron. RAF variants were the Stirling Mk I, Mk II and Mk III.
Short Sunderland	Mk.3, MR.5	20	United Kingdom	Four-engine long-range transport Flying boat Four-engined maritime reconnaissance flying boat	1944	1967	The Sunderlands were operated by No. 5 Squadron RNZAF, No. 6 Squadron RNZAF and 490 (NZ) Squadron. The RAF variant was the Sunderland Mk III. See Short Sunderland in New Zealand service	NZ4101 - 4120
Supermarine Seafire	Mk XV	1	United Kingdom	Ground-based instructional airframe.	1946	1952	Ex-804 Naval Air Squadron, Fleet Air Arm.	
Supermarine Spitfire			United Kingdom	Single-seat fighter, fighter bomber aircraft.	1941	1945	RAF aircraft were operated by 485 (NZ) Squadron. RAF variants were the Spitfire Mk IA, Mk IIA, Mk VB, Mk VC, Mk IX, LF Mk IX, LF Mk IXC, LF Mk XVI and LF XVIE.	
Supermarine Walrus	Mk I	11	United Kingdom	Three-seat reconnaissance spotter amphibian aircraft Single-engine reconnaissance, pilot trainer amphibian aircraft	1936	1947	Nine other aircraft were serving on board the ships of the New Zealand Division of the Royal Navy. The aircraft were embarked on board the light cruisers HMNZS Achilles HMS Gambia and HMNZS Leander. All RN loan aircraft were either lost on service or returned to RN, RCAF, or RAAF.	NZ151 - 160, K8558
Vickers Vildebeest	Mk II, Mk III, Mk IV	39	United Kingdom	Three-seat general reconnaissance, advanced pilot trainer, target tug biplane.	1935	1944	The Aircraft were operated by Nos 1, 2, 3, 7, 8 Squadrons. Also see Vickers Vincent	NZ101 - 139
Vickers Vincent		62	United Kingdom	Three-seat general purpose, bomber, general reconnaissance, advanced pilot trainer, target tug biplane.	1939	1944	The aircraft were operated by Nos 1, 2, 3, 4, 5, 7, 8, 42 Squadrons. See also Vildebeest	NZ300 - 361
Vickers Wellington	Mk I	30	United Kingdom	Twin-engine medium bomber aircraft	1939	1942	Only 18 were taken on charge before all 30 aircraft and their crews were loaned to the RAF in August 1939, additional RAF aircraft were operated by 75 (NZ) Squadron. RAF variants were the Wellington Mk I, MK IA, Mk IC and B Mk III.	NZ300 - 329
Vought Corsair	F4U-1, F4U-1D, FG-1D	424	United States	Single-seat fighter, fighter bomber aircraft	1944	1948	The Corsair was operated by Nos 14, 15, 16, 17, 18, 19, 20, 21, 22, 23, 24, 25, 26 Squadrons in New Zealand and the South Pacific.	NZ5201 - 5487, NZ5501 - 5577, NZ5601 - 5660
Waco QDC	Model QDC	1	United States	Single-engine light cabin biplane	1940	1941	One civilian aircraft was impressed into RNZAF service in 1940. Impressed from Mount Cook Airline in 1940.	NZ570
Waco UIC	Model UIC	1	United States	Single-engine light cabin biplane	1939	1946	One civilian aircraft was impressed into RNZAF service in 1939.	NZ574
Waco UOC	Model UOC	1	United States	Single-engine light cabin biplane	1939	1946	One civilian aircraft was impressed into RNZAF service in 1939. An additional 2 Waco cabin biplanes with RAF serials were privately purchased by servicemen of the New Zealand Army in the Long Range Desert Group (a special forces type organisation) for use behind enemy lines by that organisation during the North African campaign (and flown with logo of a white kiwi on black background).	NZ575
Westland Wasp	Wasp HAS 1	18	United Kingdom	Naval anti-submarine, utility helicopter	1966	1998	Operated by No. 3 Squadron RNZAF in support of the Royal New Zealand Navy. The Wasps were embarked on board the frigates HMNZS Canterbury, HMNZS Southland, HMNZS Waikato, HMNZS Wellington, and the survey ship HMNZS Monowai. Eight original ordered and an additional 10 former Royal Navy helicopters were acquired in 1989 for spares, one was later rebuilt to flying condition, others were never flown.	NZ3901 - 3909

== Guided missiles of the RNZAF, RNZN and New Zealand Army ==
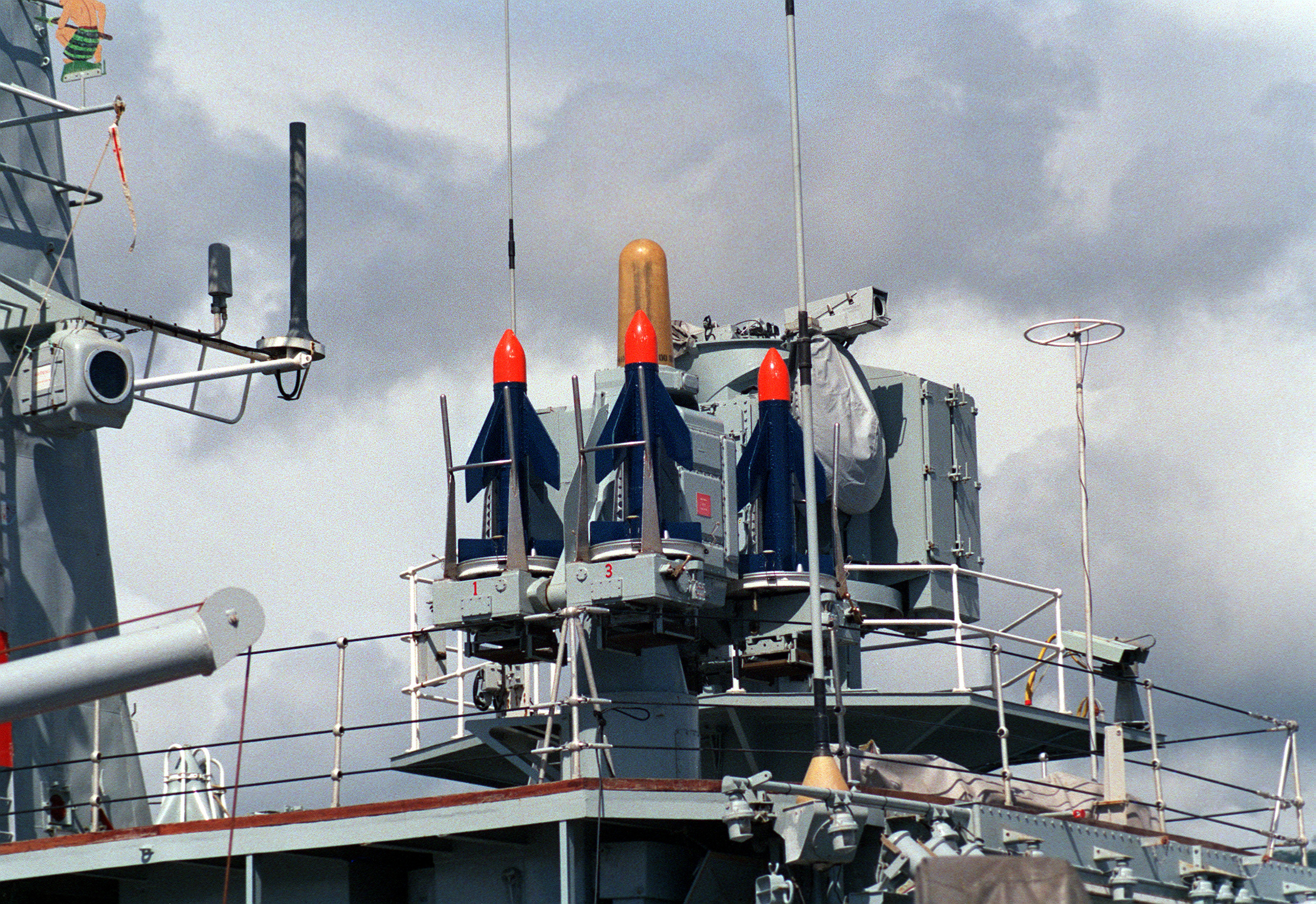
Sea Cat launcher and GWS-21 director on HMNZS Wellington

=== Royal New Zealand Air Force ===
Model	Variants	Origin	Role	Service period	Notes
AIM-9 Sidewinder	AIM-9G; AIM-9L	United States	Short-range infra-red homing air-to-air missile	1974–2001	Obsolete, no longer in service with the RNZAF. Carried by the A-4G and A-4K Skyhawk aircraft.
AGM-65 Maverick	AGM-65B; AGM-65G; AGM-65NZ	United States	Air-to-surface missile Air-to-surface anti-ship missile	1986–	Obsolete, no longer in service with the RNZAF or the RNZN. Carried by the A-4G and A-4K Skyhawk aircraft, SH-2F Seasprite and SH-2G Super Seasprite helicopters.
AGM-119B Penguin Missile	AGM-119 Penguin Mk 2 Mod 7	Norway	Air-to-surface anti-ship missile	2013–Current	Operated by the RNZAF and the RNZN. Carried by the Kaman SH-2G(I) Super Seasprite.
GBU-16 Paveway II		United States	Air-to-surface laser guided bomb		Obsolete, no longer operated by the RNZAF. Carried by the A-4K Skyhawk.

=== New Zealand Army ===
Model	Variants	Origin	Type	Caliber	Service period	Notes
FGM-148 Javelin		United States	Man-portable guided anti-tank missile	5.0-inch (127-mm)	1997–current	24 launchers, 120 missiles.
Mistral missile		France	Short-range man-portable surface-to-air missile		1997–current	12 launchers. Not in active use.

=== Royal New Zealand Navy ===
Model	Variants	Origin	Role	Service period	Notes
Sea Ceptor		Italy, United Kingdom	Surface-to-air missile	2018–current	Part of the armament of the upgraded Anzac-class frigates.
Ikara	GWS-40 Ikara	Australia	Surface-to-surface anti-submarine missile	1983–1989	Obsolete missile, no longer in service with the RNZN. The Ikara was fitted to HMNZS Southland, one of the Leander-class frigates.
Sea Cat	Seacat GWS-22	United Kingdom	Short-range surface-to-air anti-aircraft missile	1960-1990s	Obsolete missile, no longer in service with the RNZN. The Seacats were fitted to the Leander-class frigates and the modified Rothesay-class frigates.
Sea Sparrow	RIM-7P Sea Sparrow	United States	Maritime surface-to-air missile	1997–2018	Fitted to the Anzac-class frigates. Replaced by the Sea Ceptor.

== Torpedoes ==
=== Homing Torpedoes of the Royal New Zealand Air Force ===
Model	Variants	Origin	Role	Service period	Notes
Mark 44 torpedo		United States	Air-launched anti-submarine homing torpedo	1966–	Obsolete, no longer in service with the RNZAF. Carried by the P-3K Orion, SH-2F Seasprite and Wasp HAS 1.
Mark 46 torpedo		United States	Air-launched anti-submarine homing torpedo	1972–Current	Carried by the P-3K2 Orion and SH-2G Super Seasprite.

=== Unguided Torpedeos of the Royal New Zealand Navy ===
Model	Variants	Origin	Role	Service period	Notes
British 18-inch torpedo	Mark VII	United Kingdom			

=== Homing Torpedoes of the Royal New Zealand Navy ===
Model	Variants	Origin	Role	Service period	Notes
Mark 20 Bidder 21-inch torpedo	Mark 20(E) Bidder	United Kingdom	Anti-submarine torpedo		Part of the armament of the Rothesay-class frigates.
Mark 44 torpedo		United States	Air-launched anti-submarine torpedo	1983–1989	Obsolete, on longer in service with the RNZN. The Mark 44 torpedo was carried by the Ikara anti-submarine missile.
Mark 46 torpedo		United States	Lightweight anti-submarine torpedo	Current	Currently in service on board the Anzac-class frigates. The Mark 46 torpedo was part of the armament of the Leander-class frigate.

== Unmanned aerial vehicles ==
=== New Zealand Army ===
Model	Variants	Origin	Role	Service period	Notes
AeroVironment RQ-11 Raven		United States	Unmanned aerial vehicle		Loaned by the US for use in Afghanistan.
AeroVironment RQ-20 Puma		United States	Unmanned aerial reconnaissance vehicle		One aircraft. A single Puma is in operational service with the New Zealand Army.
Black Hornet Nano		Norway	Reconnaissance and battlefield surveillance		Used by the New Zealand Special Air Service.
Mavic (unmanned aerial vehicle)	DJI Mavic Pro	China	Training and experimentation unmanned aerial vehicle		26 aircraft.
Phantom (unmanned aerial vehicle series)	DJI Phantom 4	China	Training and experimentation unmanned aerial vehicle		One aircraft.
Skycam Kahu		New Zealand	Training and limited battlefield surveillance and reconnaissance		At least six aircraft. Kahu was designed by the Defence Technology Agency. It served as a vehicle for technology development and enabled the NZDF to gain first-hand experience as an RPAS operator. Kahu has also been deployed operationally on a limited basis.
AeroVironment Switchblade	Switchblade 600 Switchblade 300	United States	Unmanned Loitering Munition		150 Switchblade 600 drones and 200 Switchblade 300 are in operational service with the New Zealand Defence Force.
Syos Aerospace SG400		New Zealand	Unmanned Ground Vehicle	2026-Present	Amount of SG400 in NZDF Arsenal undisclosed.
Syos Aerospace SM300		New Zealand	Unmanned Surface Vehicle	2026-Present	Amount of SM300 in NZDF Arsenal undisclosed.
Syos Aerospace SA2		New Zealand	Unmanned Aerial Vehicle	2026-Present	Amount of SA2 in NZDF Arsenal undisclosed.
Syos Aerospace SA7		New Zealand	One-way attack drone	2026-Present	Amount of SA7 in NZDF Arsenal undisclosed.

== Unguided Rocket Weapons ==
=== New Zealand Army ===
Model	Variants	Origin	Type	Caliber	Service period	Notes
Bazooka	M20 Mk II Super Bazooka	United States	Man-portable recoilless anti-tank rocket launcher	3.5-inch (90-mm)	1954-	Obsolete, no longer in service with the NZ Army.
M72 LAW		United States	Short-range anti-tank rocket launcher	2.6-inch (66-mm)	1970-	A single shot disposable anti-tank weapon.

=== Royal New Zealand Air Force ===
Model	Variants	Origin	Role	Service period	Notes
CRV7		Canada	70-mm (2.75-inch) air-to-surface rocket	1970-2001	Formerly carried by the MB-339, A-4G and A-4K Skyhawk.
Folding-Fin Aerial Rockets		United States	70-mm (2.75-inch) air-to-surface rocket	1970-2001	Formerly carried by the A-4G and A-4K Skyhawk.
Zuni		United States	127-mm (5.0-inch) air-to-surface rocket	1970-2001	Formerly carried by the A-4G and A-4K Skyhawk.

== List of Weapons of the Royal New Zealand Air Force ==
=== Free-Fall Bombs ===
- 5-lb Mark 106 practice bomb
- 25-lb BDU 33 practice bomb
- 500-lb (227-kg) Mark 82 bomb – Carried by the A-4G and A-4K Skyhawk
- 1000-lb (454-kg) Mark 83 bomb – Carried by the A-4G and A-4K Skyhawk, P-3K Orion

=== Machine Guns ===
- 7.62-mm FN MAG-58 machine-gun – Current
- 7.62-mm M60 machine-gun – Fitted to the UH-1H Iroquois, SH-2F Seasprite and SH-2G Super Seasprite
