= No. 19 Squadron RNZAF =

No. 19 Squadron
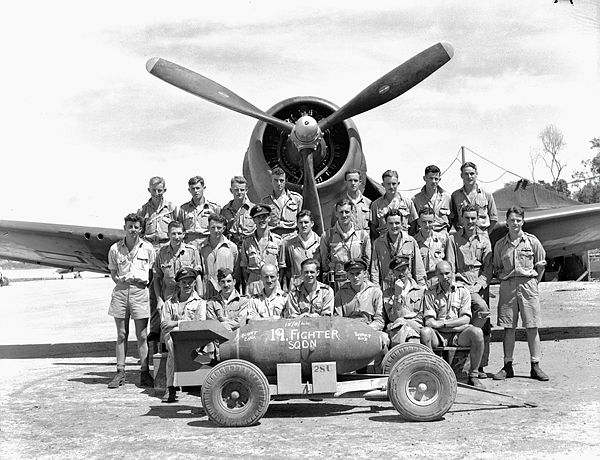
- No. 19 Squadron personnel in front of a Corsair, during their second tour of duty in August 1944 at Torokina, Bougainville. Written on the bomb in foreground: "blunt end" (left) "15/8/44, 19 FIGHTER SQDN (centre) and "sharp end" (right)
- Active: 1941–1945
- Country: New Zealand
- Branch: Royal New Zealand Air Force
- Type: Fighter bomber
- Engagements: Pacific theatre, World War II

No. 19 Squadron was a squadron of the Royal New Zealand Air Force. Formed on 10 December 1941 at RNZAF Station Ohakea from members of No. 3 Squadron equipped with P-40 Kittyhawk and later with the Chance-Vought F4U-1 Corsair fighter bombers.

== History ==
The squadron was formed in November 1943 equipped with the P-40 Kittyhawk, and was deployed to Guadalcanal from February 1944. In March that year, it relieved No. 18 Squadron on Bougainville, flying patrol and ground attack missions against Japanese forces. It was regularly rotated between Guadalcanal and operations from Bougainville until November when it moved to Emirau Island in the Bismarck Archipelago, where it provided day fighter defence until January 1945.

The squadron's forward operational base continued to move forward as Allied forces advanced, with the squadron moving to Los Negros Island in the Admiralty Islands in March 1945 and Jacquinot Bay in New Britain in July, from where it flew missions against the Japanese bases at Rabaul. It disbanded in October 1945.

== Commanding officers ==
- Squadron Leader H. R. Wigley
- Squadron Leader M. T. Vanderpump
- Squadron Leader J. R. C. Kilian
- Squadron Leader H. A. Eaton
