= RNZAF Station Waipapakauri =

Former airbase in Northland, New Zealand

Coordinates: 35.0207°S 173.2256°E

RNZAF Station Waipapakauri was a Royal New Zealand Air Force station located at Waipapakauri, 14 km north of Kaitaia, Northland Region, New Zealand. Originally established in 1933 as a small local aerodrome, it was commandeered as an air force base by the RNZAF at the outbreak of war in 1939.

The New Zealand Division of the Royal Navy established a radio intercept and direction finding (D/F) station here as part of a network throughout the country.

== World War II ==
Being the most northerly airbase in New Zealand, it was enlarged to cope with front-line fighters and bombers. Originally it was used as a maritime aviation patrol base using elderly Vickers Vincent bombers scouting the northern approaches to New Zealand and looking out for German surface raiders that were operating in the area.

In 1941, after the attack on Pearl Harbor, the base was further enlarged and permanent structures fortified with large bunkers, aircraft revetments, underground command centres and a base hospital built. The main runway was lengthened and strengthened as well as lengthening the crosswind runways which involved culverting a small stream that became prone to flooding in heavy downpours. Hawker Hind trainers, Vickers Vincent maritime patrol bombers, Curtiss P-40 point defence fighters, and Lockheed Hudson bombers were based there. Later in the War, Vought F4U Corsair fighters were also stationed at the base. As Waipapakauri was the closest base to the Pacific Theater of Operations, many military transport aircraft transited through for refuelling heading to and from operations. These included Douglas C-47 Dakota/Skytrains of all the Allied nations fighting in the Pacific.

At the end of hostilities in 1945, the airbase was closed and facilities abandoned, the far more suitable Kaitaia Airport nearby being developed with a paved runway.

== Today ==
Today remnants include the command bunker, some weather-worn revetments and the base hospital which is now the Waipapakauri Hotel. The main runway is still well defined from the air as well as on Google Earth. State Highway 1 cuts across the southern end of the runway. In the 1950s the culvert across the main crosswind runway was opened out to prevent seasonal flooding that it caused. The runways have been turned back into farmland. An official memorial next to the hotel carpark bears testimony of the base's past existence.

== See also ==
- No. 7 Squadron RNZAF (No. 1 GR Squadron operated from this airfield also)
