= No. 8 Squadron RNZAF =

- Active: March 1942 – May 1943; October 1944 – March 1945
- Country: New Zealand
- Branch: Royal New Zealand Air Force
- Role: Reconnaissance
- Garrison/HQ: RNZAF Station Waipapakauri
- Equipment: Vickers Vincent; Vickers Vildebeest; Lockheed Ventura
- Engagements: World War II

No. 8 Squadron was a bomber reconnaissance squadron of the Royal New Zealand Air Force. Formed in March 1942 at Ohakea, the squadron was equipped with obsolescent Vickers Vincent and Vickers Vildebeest torpedo bombers. It was reformed as No. 30 Squadron, a dive bomber unit in May 1943.

== History ==
In response to Japan's entry into World War II, the squadron was formed in March 1942 for the defence of New Zealand using obsolescent Vickers Vincent and Vickers Vildebeest torpedo bombers, which had been being used up to that point for training pilots bound to the war in Europe. As the risk of Japanese aggression reduced, the squadron was reformed as a dive bomber squadron in preparation to going on the offensive in May 1943. At this time it was designated No. 30 Squadron and re-equipped with Grumman Avengers.

== Commanding officers ==
The following officers commanded No. 8 Squadron:

- Squadron Leader C. L. Monckton April–September 1942
- Squadron Leader I. G. Morrison September 1942–April 1943
- Flight Lieutenant M. Wilkes April–May 1943
