= No. 30 Squadron RNZAF =

No. 30 Squadron Royal New Zealand Air Force
- Active: 1943-1944
- Country: New Zealand
- Allegiance: New Zealand
- Branch: Royal New Zealand Air Force
- Role: Bomber
- Motto: Kai-Takitaki
- Equipment: Grumman TBF Avenger
- Engagements: World War II: Pacific Theater

No. 30 Squadron RNZAF was a New Zealand light bomber squadron which saw service against the Japanese in the Pacific Theatre during the last two years of the Second World War.

== History ==
No.30 Squadron formed on 28 May 1943, being stood up at RNZAF Station Gisborne as an amalgamation of airmen from No. 7 Squadron RNZAF and No. 8 Squadron RNZAF, which had been disbanded following the withdrawal of the Vickers Vildebeest aircraft from service. Flight lieutenant Fred Adams temporarily held command of the Squadron until the following month when Squadron leader Richard Hartshorn took command of the unit. For the first few months the squadron operated North American T-6 Texans and Vickers Vincent aircraft inherited from No.8 Squadron, although would later equip with Grumman TBF Avenger Torpedo bombers.

In 1944 the Squadron, equipped with Avengers, deployed to Luganville Airfield on Espiritu Santo island in the Pacific for operational training with US Navy and USMC units. At this point in the war the need for dedicated torpedo bombers had died down and the 30 Squadron aircrews mainly focused on other forms of anti-ship warfare including dive bombing.

By March 1944 the Squadron had deployed further up North to Bougainville, Papua New Guinea in order to take part in operations against Japanese forces in the Pacific Theater. 30 Squadron ground crews arrived at their base on Bougainville, Empress Augusta Bay by 15 March and spent the first week unloading their equipment and improving the base. The Avenger aircraft arrived at the base shortly after, at the base they were also joined by No. 25 Squadron RNZAF flying SBD Dauntless dive bombers.

Shortly after the Squadron started flying operational sorties against Japanese forces from the Island. On 26 March 30 Squadron Avenger's took part in the attack on the Japanese owned Kavieng Airport, New Ireland, alongside American forces.

Until May 1944 the Squadron flew 573 combat sorties against the Japanese forces, losing three aircrews over the course of their deployment. The Squadron was relieved by Avengers and crew from No. 31 Squadron RNZAF and returned to New Zealand before disbanding in July 1944.

== Commanding Officers ==
No. 30 Sqn formed at RNZAF Station Gisbrone 4th of June 1943 as No 30 (Dive-Bomber) Squadron

- Sqn Ldr R. G. Hartshorn (Jun 1943-Apr 1944)
- Sqn Ldr H. N. James (Apr 1944-Jun 1944)

No. 30 Squadron disbanded on the 26th of June 1944

== Surviving Aircraft ==
A 30 Squadron Grumman Avenger is preserved by the Gisborne Aviation Preservation Society.
