= No. 23 Squadron RNZAF =

No. 23 Squadron
- Active: 1944–1945
- Country: New Zealand
- Branch: Royal New Zealand Air Force
- Type: Fighter bomber
- Size: Squadron
- Garrison/HQ: RNZAF Station Ardmore
- Nickname: 'The Ghosts'
- Engagements: World War II: Pacific theatre

No. 23 Squadron was a squadron of the Royal New Zealand Air Force. It was formed in August 1944 at RNZAF Station Ardmore equipped with the F4U-1 Corsair fighter bomber.

== History ==
The squadron was established at RNZAF Ardmore in August 1944. It moved to Palikulo Bay Airfield on Espiritu Santo to continue training in September. In late October 1944 it moved to Kukum Field on Guadalcanal, where it flew ground attack missions on Bougainville targeting Japanese positions until 14 November. In late November 1944, it moved to Momote Field on Los Negros Island where it flew combat air patrols in defence of the island. In February 1945, the squadron moved to Guadalcanal and then to Emirau from March–May and then to Piva Airfield on Bougainville from June–October 1945.

== Insignia and Motto ==
The squadron used an unofficial emblem, which was a 'Grim Reaper' / 'Ghost' like figure, leading them to be known as the 'Ghosts' or 'Ghost Squadron'. These emblems were painted on the engine cowling or side of the cockpit of their aircraft. Due to the fact the squadron was formed late in the war, it was never granted an official badge or motto.

== Commanding officers ==
- Squadron Leader J. J. de Willimoff (August 1944 – May 1945);
- Squadron Leader D. E. Hogan (May–October 1945).
