= No. 40 Squadron RNZAF =

- Active: June 1943 – October 1947; December 1954 – present
- Country: New Zealand
- Branch: Royal New Zealand Air Force
- Role: Strategic and Tactical Air Transport
- Garrison/HQ: RNZAF Base Auckland
- Mottos: Maori: Ki nga hau e wha English: To the four winds
- Mascot: Mariners compass star
- Anniversaries: 1 June
- Equipment: Boeing 757, C-130J Super Hercules
- Engagements: World War II; Korean War; Malayan Emergency; Vietnam War; Rwandan civil war; Somali civil war; Gulf War; 1999 East Timorese crisis; Regional Assistance Mission to Solomon Islands; Iraq war; Operation Enduring Freedom.

Commanders
- Current commander: Wing Commander Bradley Scott

Insignia
- Squadron Badge: A Mariners compass representing the "Four winds."

Aircraft flown
- Transport: Douglas C-47 (1943-1947); Lockheed Model 18 Lodestar (1943-1947); Douglas DC-6 (1954-unknown); Handley Page Hastings (1954-unknown); Lockheed C-130H Hercules (1965-2025); Boeing 727 (1981-2003); Boeing 757-2K2 (2003-present); Lockheed Martin C-130J Super Hercules (2024-present)

No. 40 Squadron RNZAF is a transport squadron in the Royal New Zealand Air Force (RNZAF). Established in June 1943, it remains on active duty.

== History ==
=== Origins ===
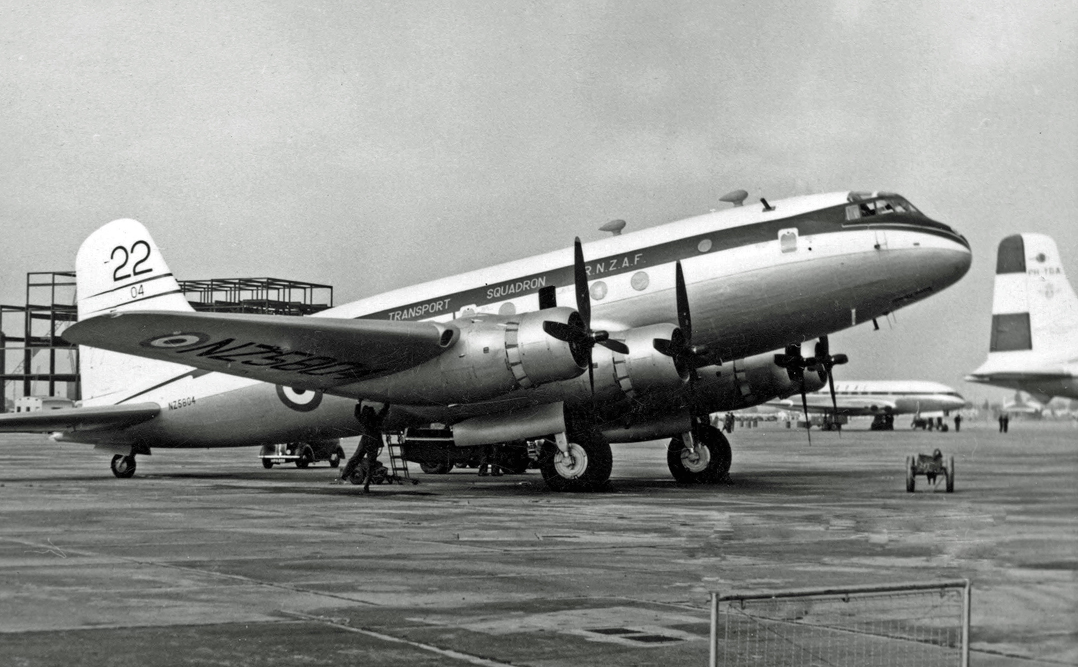
A RNZAF Hastings C.3 in 1953

The squadron was formed at Whenuapai on 1 June 1943 as No. 40 Transport Squadron RNZAF. It was equipped with Dakota and Lockheed Lodestars and carried men and supplies to forward areas throughout the Pacific theatre. Within the squadron organisation was a ferry flight of aircrew which regularly flew delivery flights from the mainland United States and Hawaii to New Zealand of new aircraft such as the Catalina flying boat and Ventura. The squadron was disbanded on 31 October 1947 and most of its crews and aircraft were transferred to the government-owned National Airways Corporation.

No. 40 Squadron reformed on 8 December 1954 with four Handley Page Hastings which had previously been operated by No. 41 Squadron RNZAF. The Squadron was supplemented with three Douglas DC-6 acquired from the defunct Australian airline, British Commonwealth Pacific Airlines by 1961. Three Lockheed C-130H Hercules were purchased in 1965 and two more in 1968.

=== Boeing 727 ===
Three Boeing 727s were purchased second hand from Boeing in 1981, all ex-United Airlines. NZ7271 19892 entered service in July 1981 and was retired on 7 July 2003. (It became 3D-KMJ and then 9Q-CMP in Africa and was scrapped in 2005). NZ7272 19893 entered service in July 1981 and was retired to Woodbourne as an instructional airframe on 25 August 2003. NZ7273 19895 was the first 727 delivered, on 6 May 1981, but flew only 21 hours, being intended from the start to be a source of spare parts. It was retired 25 June 1981. The 727s were purchased by the administration of Sir Rob Muldoon and used by the fourth and fifth Labour governments, as well as the administration of Jenny Shipley. The Boeing 727s were replaced in 2003 by two Boeing 757s.

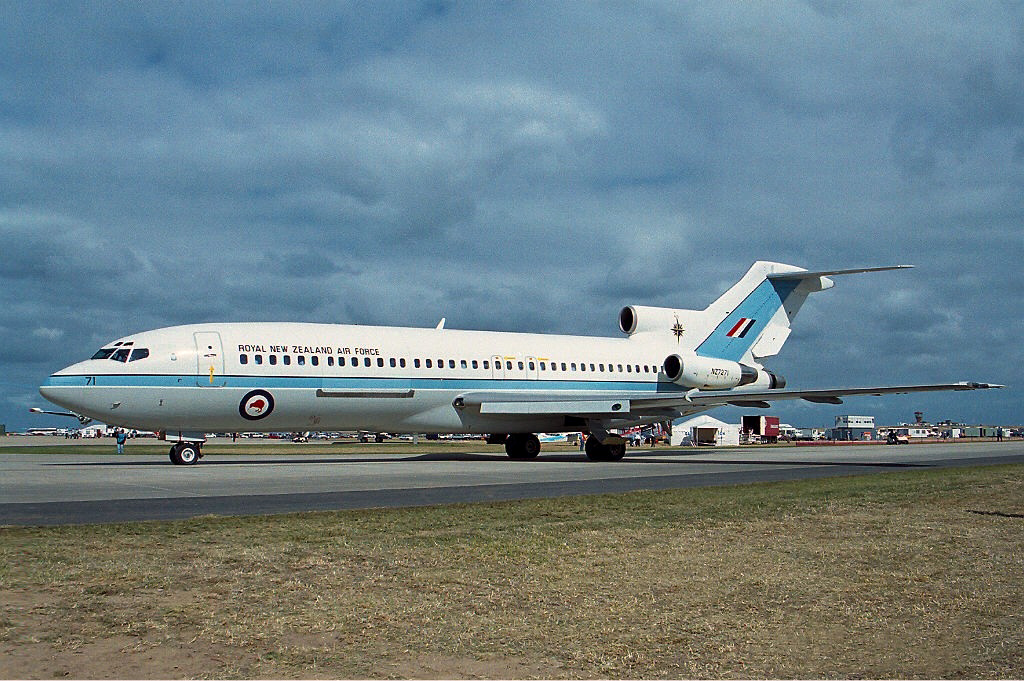
RNZAF Boeing 727 in 2001.

== Present ==
Located at RNZAF Base Whenuapai 40 Squadron operates five C-130J-30 Super Hercules, two Boeing 757-2K2’s. The C-130H(NZ) models were retired from service on 31 January 2025, and then sold to Coulson Aviation.

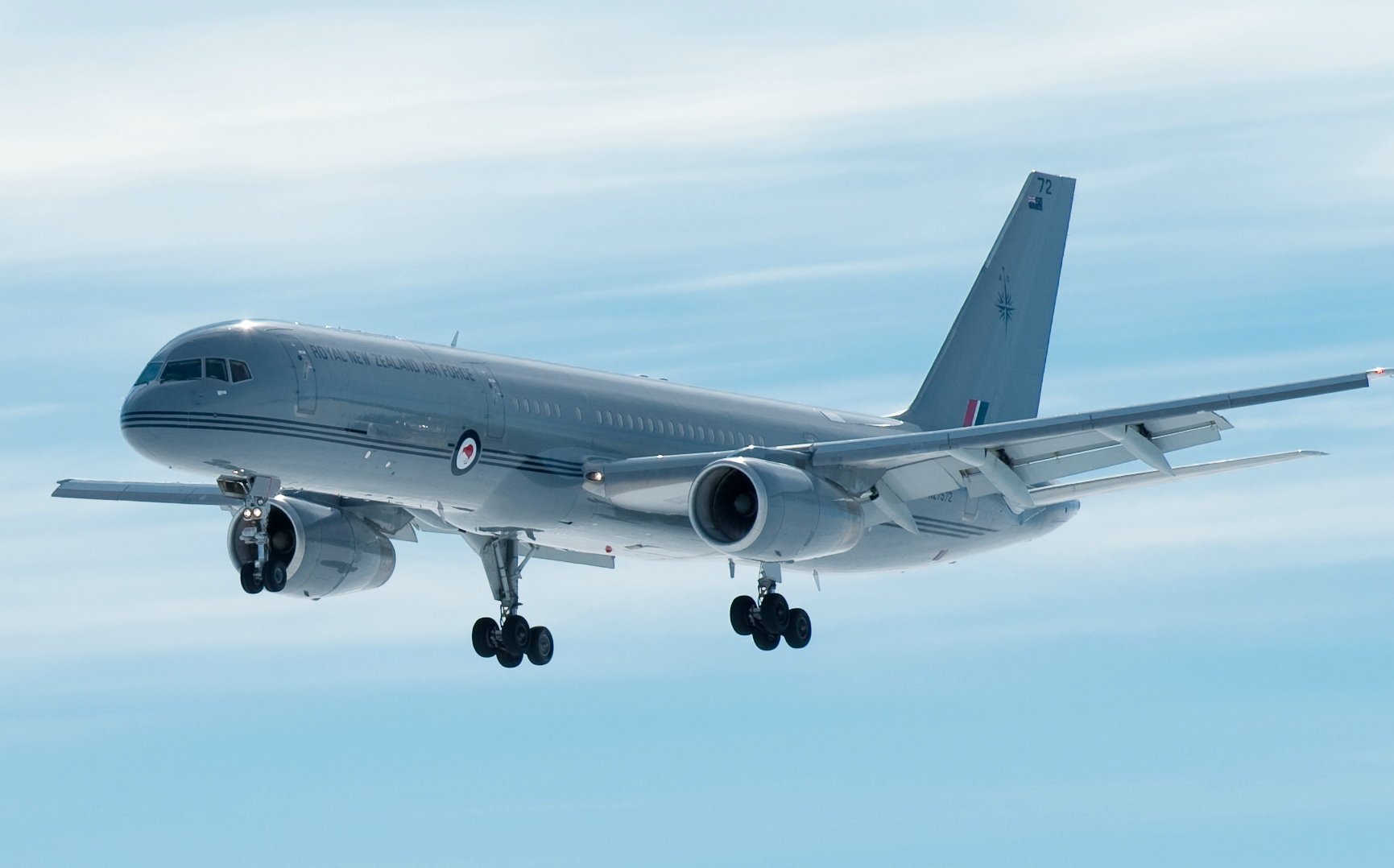
A Boeing 757 lands at Pegasus airfield on the Ross Ice Shelf

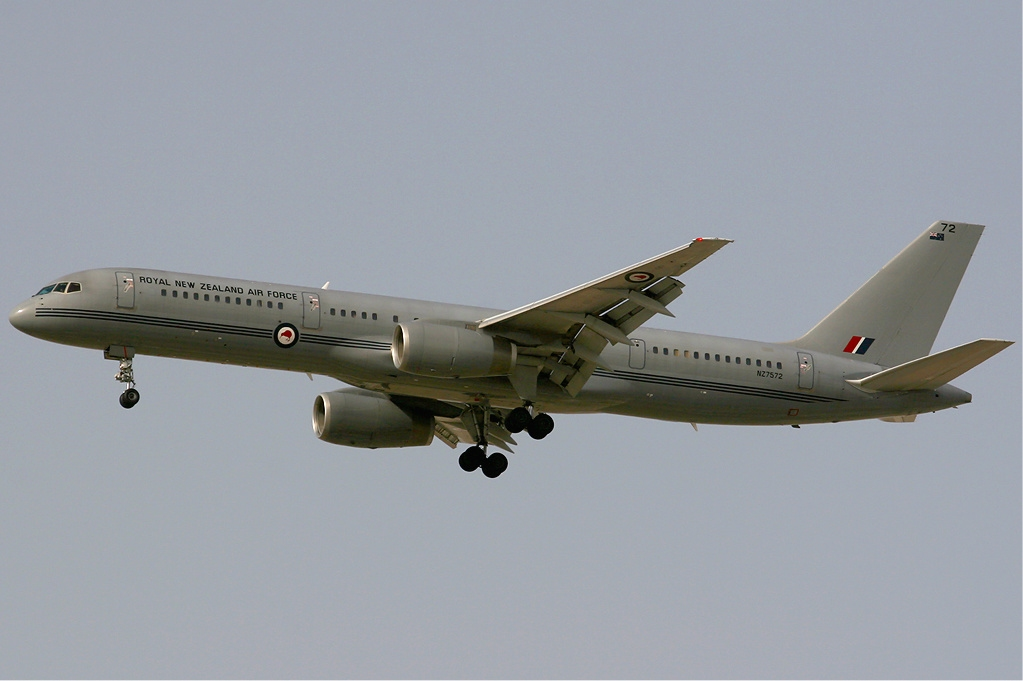
Boeing 757 of the RNZAF in 2009.

The squadron saw action throughout the Pacific War against Japan, helped supply New Zealand forces fighting in Korea, Malaya, Vietnam, East Timor, Afghanistan, and Iraq, and provided transport to United States and United Kingdom forces in the 1990 Gulf War.

Humanitarian missions have included flying in the first Cyclone Tracy relief supplies to Darwin, assisting victims of the Bali bombing and the Boxing Day tsunami. Since the late 1960s the squadron has detached aircraft each summer to work in the Ross Dependency of Antarctica. During the period 29 November to 12 December 1979, the squadron flew flights to Antarctica in support of body recovery operations associated with the Air New Zealand Flight 901 DC-10 crash which impacted the slopes of Mt Erebus with the loss of all 257 lives.

A major operation for the squadron was the 2011 Christchurch earthquake which saw nearly the entire fleet working around the clock distributing personnel, freight, SAR teams and medical supplies to the people of Christchurch. 40 Squadron aircraft worked in conjunction with C-130s from the Republic of Singapore Air Force, Royal Australian Air Force, and U.S. Air Force.

40 Squadron is held in high regard internationally, having won various tactical flying competitions in the USA competing against other air forces in exercises such as Green Flag East at Little Rock Air Force Base, Arkansas.

== Fleet ==
=== Boeing 757-2K2 ===
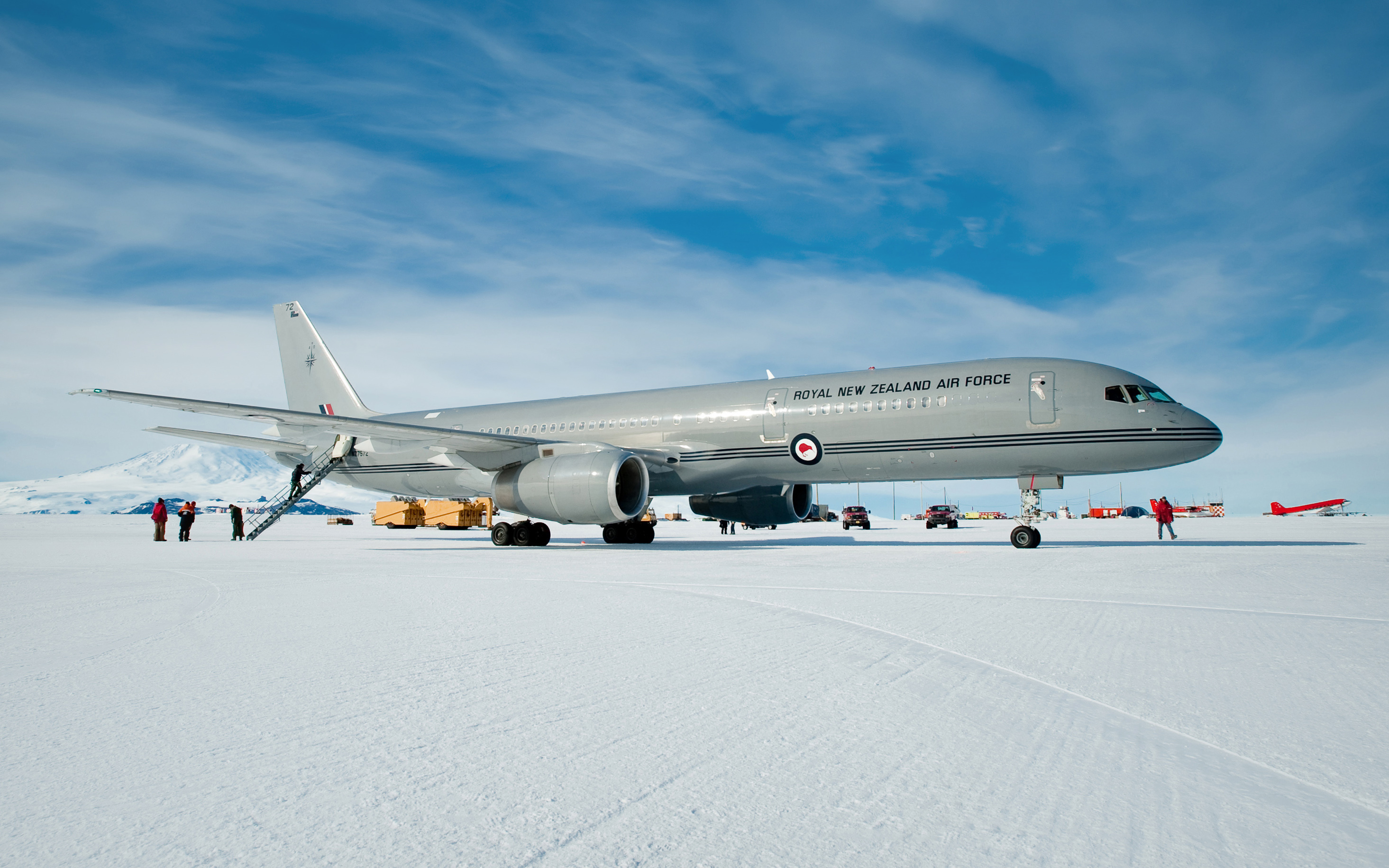
In 2009, 40 Squadron flew one of its Boeing 757s to Antarctica for the first time.

In 2003 two second-hand Boeing 757-200s were purchased from Transavia, which 40 Squadron operate in transport, freight, cargo and troop movement roles. They can also be converted for medical use in emergencies. Their registrations are NZ7571 and NZ7572. In 2024, it was decided by the Ministry of Defence that aircraft should now be replaced due to ongoing issues and maintenance problems for both aircraft.

=== C-130J-30 Super Hercules ===
The Lockheed Martin C-130J Super Hercules was announced as the replacement for the C-130Hs in June 2019 with delivery occurring in 2024. The RNZAF opted for the stretched C-130J-30 model that has an extra 4.6-metre longer fuselage, providing space for an additional two pallets of extra freight. The five new C-130J-30 Super Hercules were delivered to the RNZAF from September-December 2024. The first Super Hercules, NZ7011 arrived at RNZAF Base Whenuapai and has begun familiarisation flights to various airports around New Zealand. A further two Super Hercules, NZ7012, and NZ7013, arrived at Whenuapai on 30 September 2024, with the final two aircraft delivered by the end of 2024.

=== Airbus A321 XLR ===
In 2025 Judith Collins the Minister of Defence announced that the New Zealand government had selected the Airbus A321XLR to replace the two Boeing 757s. The new aircraft are expected to be in service with the RNZAF by 2028.
