= No. 41 Squadron RNZAF =

Transport unit in the Royal New Zealand Air Force

No. 41 Squadron
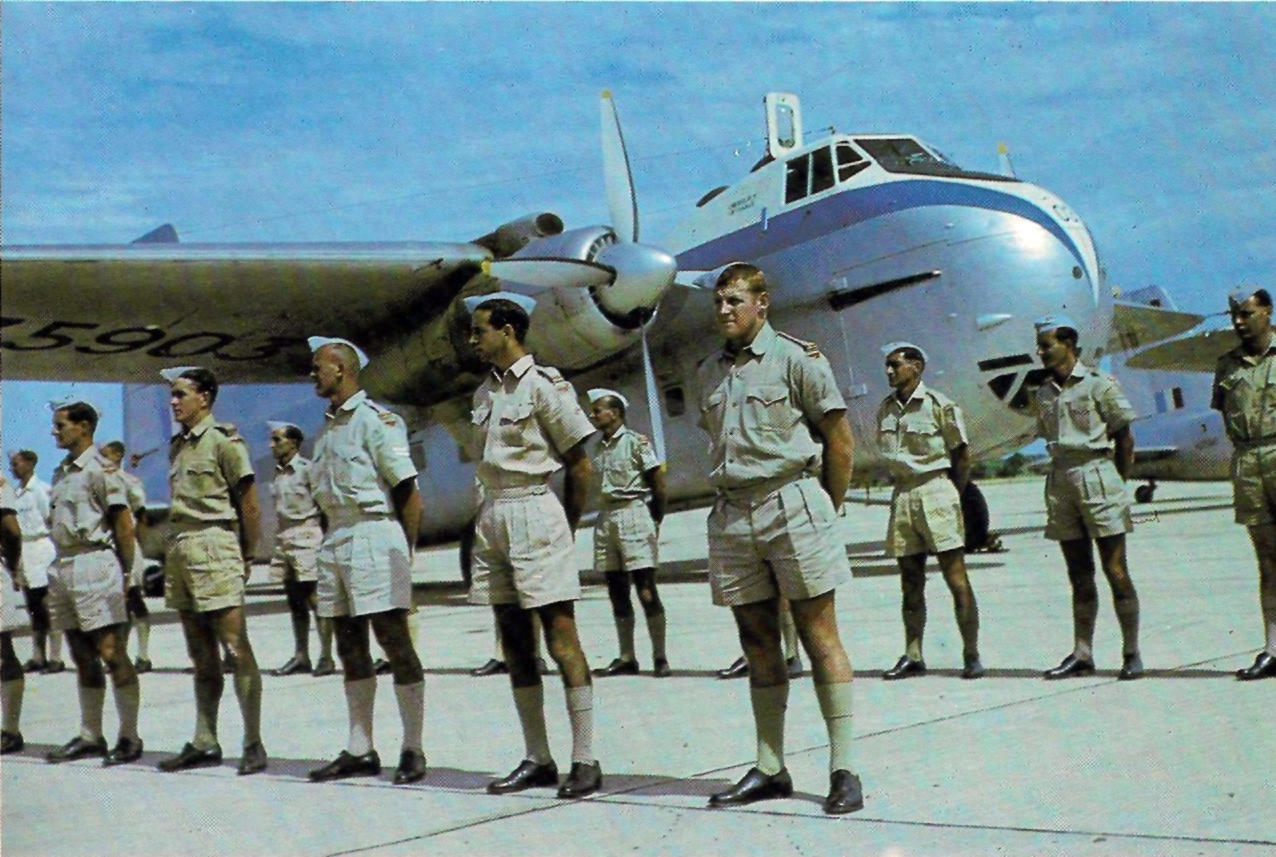
- No. 41 Squadron personnel and a Bristol Freighter in Thailand during 1962
- Active: 1944–77
- Country: New Zealand
- Branch: Royal New Zealand Air Force
- Role: Transport
- Engagements: World War II; Malayan Emergency; Indonesia–Malaysia confrontation Vietnam War

Aircraft flown
- Attack: Grumman Avenger
- Utility helicopter: Bell UH-1 Iroquois
- Transport: Lockheed Hudson; Lockheed Lodestar; Douglas Dakota; Handley Page Hastings; Bristol Freighter

No. 41 Squadron was a transport unit of the Royal New Zealand Air Force (RNZAF). The squadron was formed in 1944, and conducted transport flights in the south Pacific during World War II. It remained active after the war, and flew supplies to the New Zealand occupation force in Japan. Three crews from the squadron participated in the Berlin Airlift during 1948 and 1949, and one of its flights was temporarily based in Singapore from 1949 to 1951. From 1955 the entire squadron was stationed at Singapore, from where it participated in the Malayan Emergency, Indonesia–Malaysia confrontation and Vietnam War. Detachments of No. 41 Squadron were also based in Thailand from 1962 to 1965. The squadron was disbanded in 1977.

== History ==
=== Early years ===
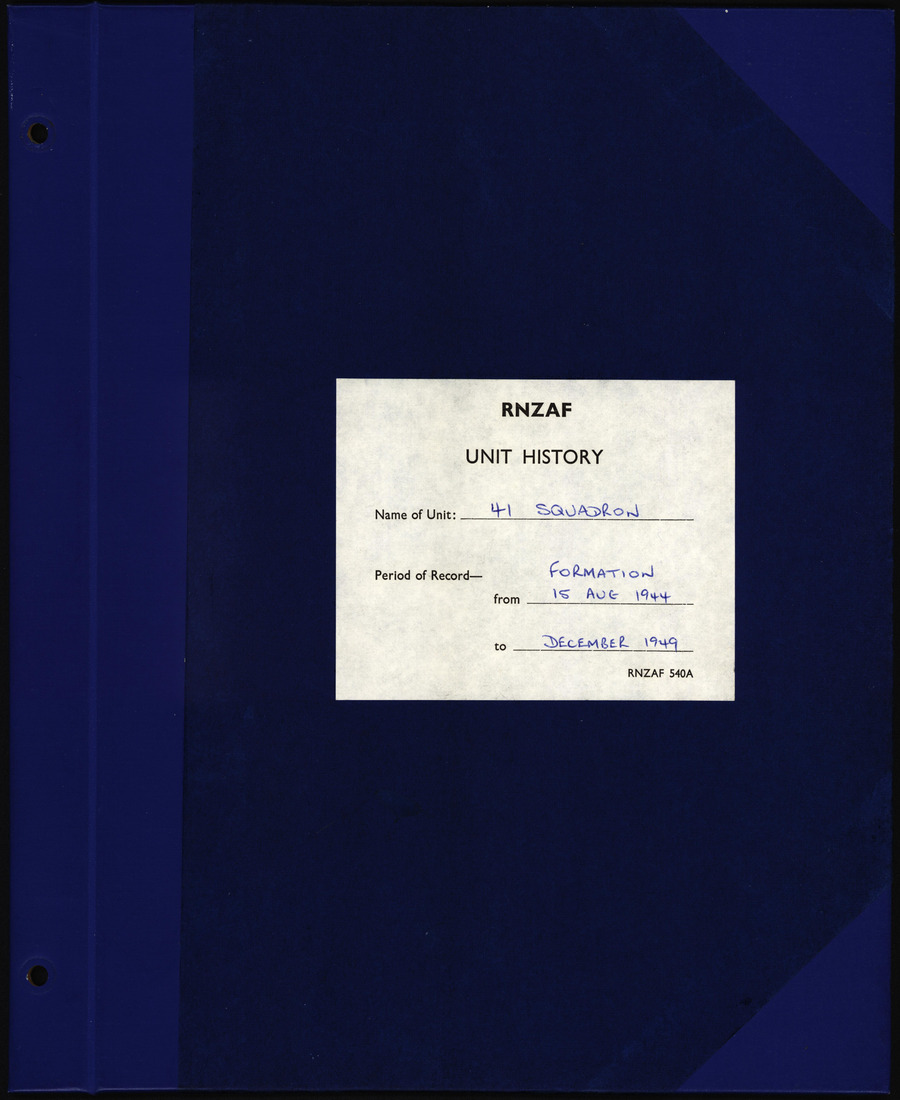
Unit history of Royal New Zealand Air Force (RNZAF) No. 41 Squadron (Aug 1944 – Dec 1949)

No. 41 Squadron was formed at RNZAF Base Whenuapai near Auckland in August 1944. It was initially equipped with twelve Lockheed Hudson and nine Lockheed Lodestar transport aircraft. These transports had been operated by No. 40 Squadron until that unit was re-equipped with Douglas Dakotas. As of November 1944 the squadron was conducting ten flights each week to Guadalcanal in the Solomon Islands to supply the Allied forces there. During the first six months of 1945 No. 41 Squadron was re-equipped with 20 new Dakotas. Following the end of the war several of No. 41 Squadron's Dakotas were deployed to Singapore to transport released prisoners of war and civilian internees back to New Zealand.

While most of the RNZAF was disbanded after World War II, both Nos. 40 and 41 Squadrons remained active and continued to operate from Whenuapai. As well as supporting other elements of the New Zealand military, these units undertook "quasi-civil" tasks due to a shortage of civilian aircraft. From February 1946 No. 41 Squadron aircraft regularly flew from New Zealand to Japan transporting supplies and personnel for J Force, the country's contribution to the British Commonwealth Occupation Force. Weekly return flights were made until April 1948 when chartered Qantas aircraft took on the task. At the time this was one of the longest air transport routes in the world, with the flights being made via Norfolk Island, Australia, Borneo, the Philippines and Okinawa. After Qantas took over the flights to Japan, No. 41 Squadron conducted weekly return flights between Singapore and New Zealand transporting British recruits for the RNZAF.

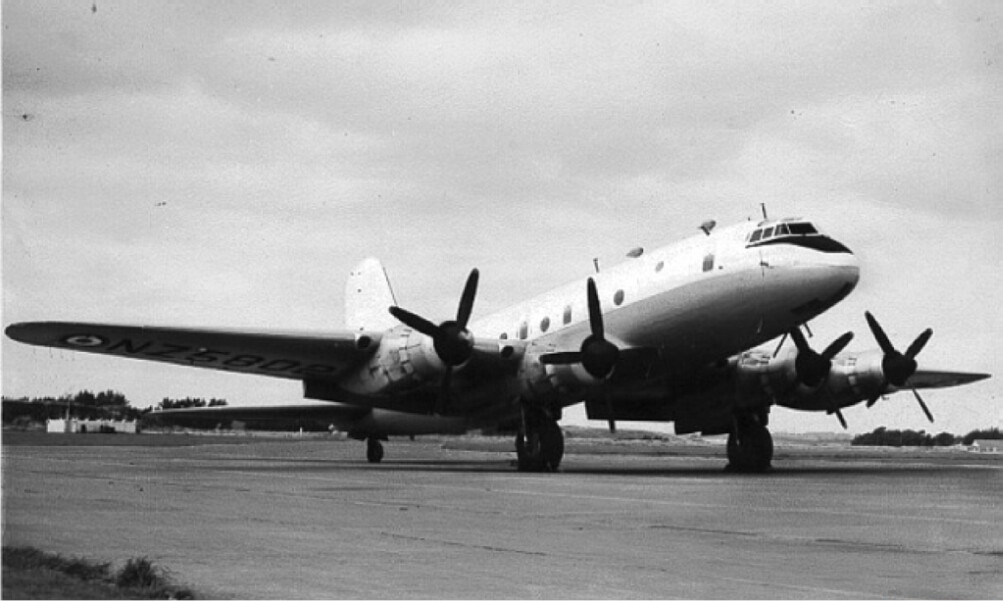
One of No. 41 Squadron's Handley Page Hastings transports in 1953

In 1948 No. 41 Squadron was selected to be one of just five squadrons in the permanent post-war RNZAF. At this time No. 41 Squadron and No. 14 Squadron were the only active RNZAF units, and the three other squadrons existed as cadres. Also in 1948 a temporary Research and Development Flight was established as part of No. 41 Squadron to conduct experimental aerial topdressing flights using Grumman Avenger aircraft.

In mid-1948 three No. 41 Squadron Dakota crews (each comprising a pilot, a navigator and a radio operator) were dispatched to Europe to operate with the Royal Air Force as New Zealand's contribution to the Berlin Airlift. The crews were based at Lübeck and conducted two flights into Berlin each day they were on duty. A second group of three crews was later dispatched to replace the first group. Following the end of the Soviet blockade of Berlin, the detachment returned to New Zealand in August 1949. At this time the main body of the squadron in New Zealand had been forced to reduce its flying hours due to a shortage of technicians to service the Dakotas. Between September 1949 and 1951, No. 41 Squadron's A Flight was based in Singapore, from where it made regular flights to Hong Kong and dropped supplies to Commonwealth forces in Malaya using three Dakotas. Due to the deployments to Germany and Singapore, at one stage of 1949 the squadron had only a single trained Dakota crew in New Zealand.

No. 41 Squadron's Dakotas were replaced by Handley Page Hastings and Bristol Freighter aircraft in the early 1950s. Most of its personnel were used to unload ships at Auckland and Wellington during the 1951 New Zealand waterfront dispute, greatly disrupting flying. When No. 14 Squadron began two and a half-year deployment to Cyprus in mid-1952, No. 41 Squadron transported its personnel there. A No. 41 Squadron Hastings was the only New Zealand aircraft to participate in the 1953 London to Christchurch air race, but it failed to complete the race after making an emergency landing at RAF Negombo in Ceylon. The squadron's Hastings were transferred to the newly reformed No. 40 Squadron in 1954.

=== Southeast Asia ===
In 1955 No. 41 Squadron, which was now equipped with four Bristol Freighters and had a strength of 73 officers and airmen, was deployed to RAF Changi in Singapore as part of an expansion of New Zealand's commitment to the Commonwealth Far East Strategic Reserve. The Bristol Freighters were slow and uncomfortable aircraft, but proved successful in transporting supplies and personnel throughout Southeast Asia. The squadron transported a very wide range of equipment, and established the first scheduled air ambulance service in Malaya. No. 41 Squadron also dropped supplies to Commonwealth forces engaged in the Malayan Emergency. On 10 December 1956 a Bristol Freighter piloted by No. 41 Squadron's commanding officer, Squadron Leader A.S. Tie, was destroyed when it crashed in the Cameron Highlands region of Malaya. Tie was killed in this accident, along with the three other aircrew, three Royal Army Service Corps air dispatchers and two Malayan film makers travelling as passengers; a fourth dispatcher survived. While the other RNZAF squadron in Malaya, No. 14 Squadron, returned home in 1958 following Malaysian independence, No. 41 Squadron remained in Singapore; at this time the squadron had a strength of three Bristol Freighters. The Whenuapai-based Transport Support Unit was responsible for training aircrew to serve with No. 41 Squadron.

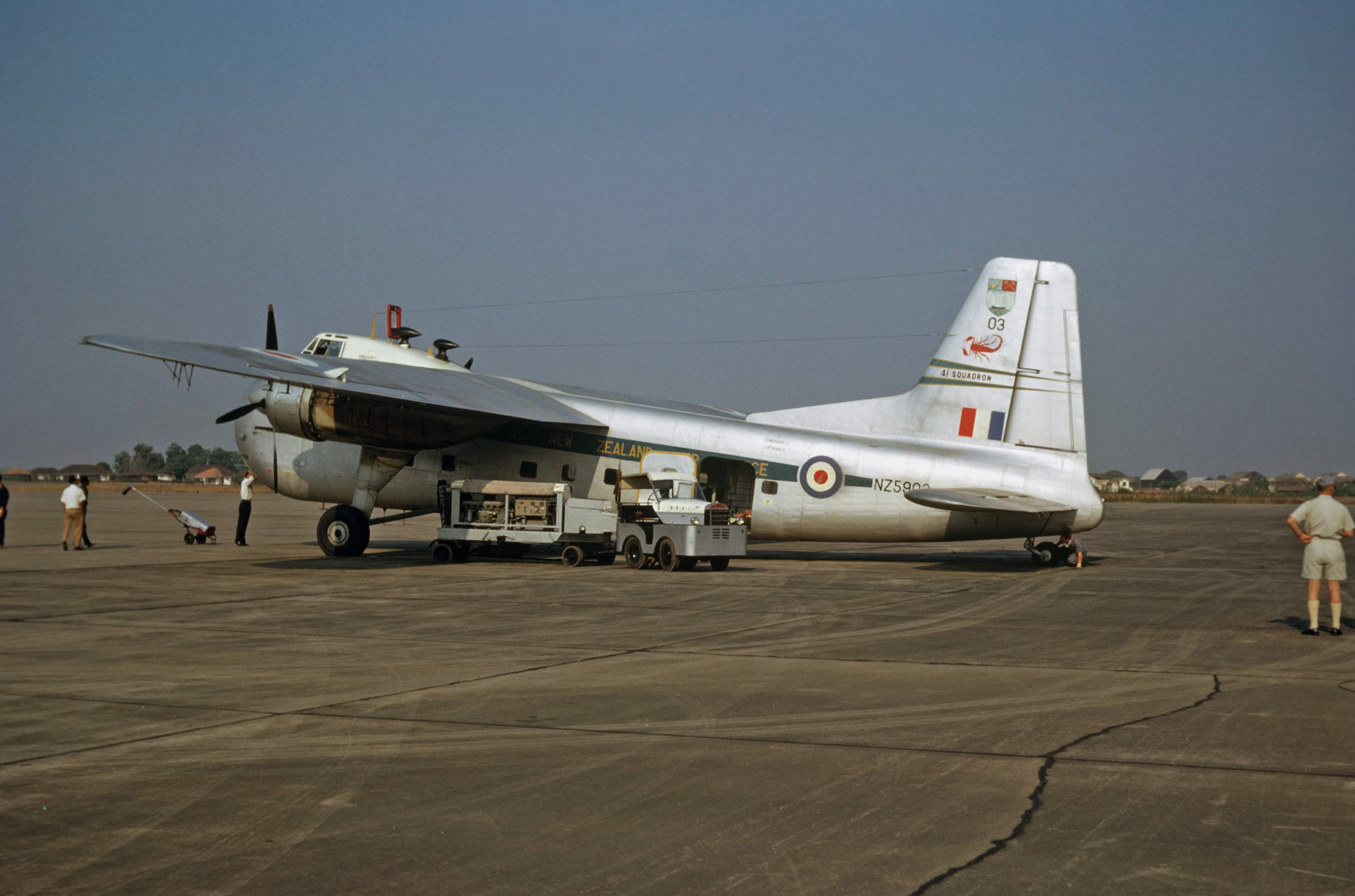
A Bristol Freighter in 41 Squadron in March 1963

A detachment of No. 41 Squadron was sent to Korat Royal Thai Air Force Base in 1962 as part of New Zealand's contribution to a Southeast Asia Treaty Organization (SEATO) force deployed to Thailand to defend the country against a feared attack by Communist forces. This detachment comprised three Bristol Freighters, and operated almost independently from the remainder of the Squadron at Singapore. The aircraft transported supplies to SEATO bases in Thailand, and also flew a detachment of 30 New Zealand Special Air Service soldiers into the country from Whenuapai during June 1962. The No. 41 Squadron detachment returned to Singapore in December 1962. Shortly afterwards the squadron provided support for the British forces which were attempting to suppress the Brunei Revolt. Two Bristol Freighters were deployed to Thailand between 1963 and 1965 to transport New Zealand Army engineers around remote areas of the country. By this time No. 41 Squadron's Bristol Freighters were becoming outdated, and historian Margaret McClure has written that they were the "slowest military aircraft in South-east Asia".

Following the outbreak of the Indonesia–Malaysia confrontation in 1963, No. 41 Squadron was involved in supplying Commonwealth forces in Borneo. The aircraft deployed from Singapore to Borneo operated intensively, with aircrew often flying three or four sorties each day. On 13 October 1965 a No. 41 Squadron Bristol Freighter was hit by machine gun fire after it accidentally crossed the Indonesian border during a supply dropping mission, but none of its crew were wounded. Following the end of the confrontation all the squadron's aircraft returned to Singapore in September 1966.

In 1966 the RNZAF considered offering a detachment of four aircraft from No. 41 Squadron as part of New Zealand's contribution to the Vietnam War. The Air Force's commanders eventually decided against this option, however. Instead, the squadron remained at Singapore, but conducted fortnightly flights into Vietnam carrying supplies for the New Zealand military units and medical teams in the country from 1965 onwards. Flights to support the medical team at Qui Nhon and the New Zealand embassy in Saigon continued after the withdrawal of New Zealand military forces in 1971. In early April 1975 the squadron established a detachment at Tan Son Nhat International Airport near Saigon to evacuate New Zealand personnel from the country as North Vietnamese forces rapidly advanced. The last No. 41 Squadron flight out of the country departed on 21 April carrying 38 embassy staff and refugees.

From 1971 a flight equipped with Bell UH-1 Iroquois helicopters joined No. 41 Squadron's four Bristol Freighters; the numbers of helicopters varied, but four were typically at Singapore. By the mid-1970s the Bristol Freighters were considered obsolete, and the RNZAF's newer Lockheed C-130 Hercules and Hawker Siddeley Andover aircraft could be rapidly deployed to Singapore to provide transport when required. As a result, No. 41 Squadron returned to New Zealand and disbanded during December 1977. Following the disbandment of the unit, its Iroquois aircraft remained in Singapore as Support Unit Singapore, which was renamed No. 141 Flight RNZAF in 1985 to recognise its origins. This flight was disbanded in 1989, ending the permanent presence of RNZAF units in South East Asia.
