= No. 31 Squadron RNZAF =

No. 31 Squadron
- Active: 1943–1944
- Country: New Zealand
- Branch: Royal New Zealand Air Force
- Type: Torpedo bomber and Bomber
- Motto: Kia Mataara
- Equipment: TBF Avenger
- Engagements: World War II: Pacific theatre

== Overview ==
No. 31 Squadron was a squadron of the Royal New Zealand Air Force that saw service in the Pacific theatre of the Second World War. Formed in December 1943, it was equipped with Grumman TBF Avenger Torpedo bombers.

== History ==
31 Squadron was formed alongside No. 30 Squadron in 1943 at RNZAF Gisborne and remained stationed in New Zealand from December 1943 to May 1944. The squadron deployed to Piva Airfield on Bougainville from May to July 1944 to relieve 30 Squadron. Though the Avenger was primarily designed for torpedo bombing, No. 31 Squadron performed dive bombing operations using them, targeting Japanese land based infrastructure, including Tobera Airfield, where one Avenger, NZ2512 was shot down, with the loss of 2 of the 3 crew. The squadron was disbanded in August 1944.

== Insignia and motto ==
The badge of 31 Squadron included a carved Greenstone Taniwha above two crossed Mere. The squadron's motto (also included on the badge) was Kia Mataara, Te reo Maori for "Watch" or "Be Vigilant"

== Commanding officers ==
Formed at RNZAF Station Gisborne on the 7th December 1943 No 31 (Dive-Bomber) Squadron

- Squadron Leader M. Wilkes.

== See Also ==
- Royal New Zealand Air Force (Pacific Section)
- List of former Royal New Zealand Air Force stations
- Bougainville campaign
