= No. 26 Squadron RNZAF =

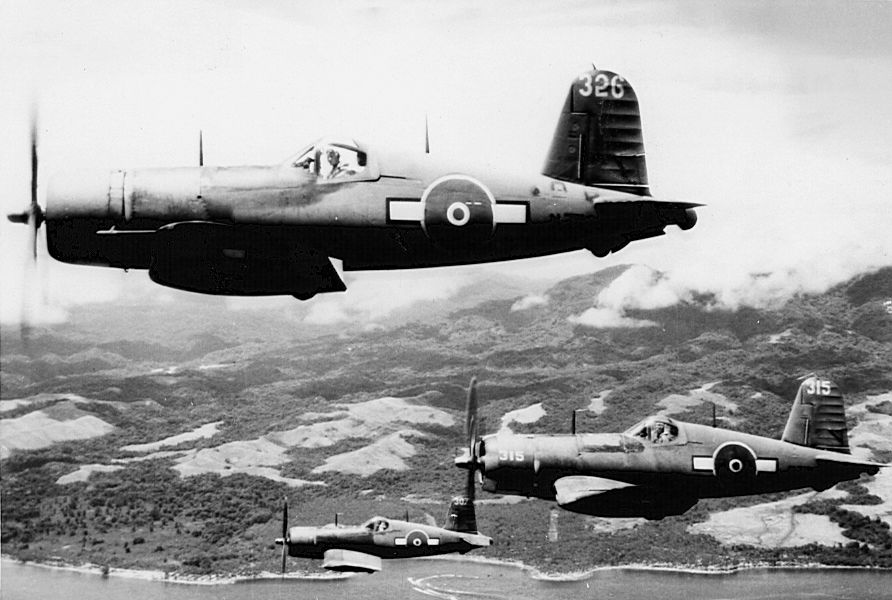
- F4U-1s of 26 Squadron in flight.
- Active: October 1943- June 1945
- Country: New Zealand
- Branch: Royal New Zealand Air Force
- Type: Fighter bomber
- Garrison/HQ: RNZAF Station Seagrove
- Engagements: Pacific theatre, World War II

No. 26 Squadron RNZAF was a squadron of the Royal New Zealand Air Force. Formed in October 1943, during World War II, from "C Flight", No. 25 Squadron at RNZAF Station Seagrove to be equipped with Douglas SBD Dauntless dive bombers, however was disbanded in January 1944. Reformed in March 1945 at RNZAF Station Ardmore, equipped with Chance-Vought F4U-1 Corsair fighter bombers. The squadron was based at Kukum Field on Guadalcanal and Piva Airfield on Bougainville before being disbanded in June 1945.

== Commanding Officer ==
Formed at RNZAF Station Ardmore on the 1st March 1945 as No. 26 (Fighter) Squadron

- Squadron Leader G. A. Delves (Mar 1945-July 1945)

Disbanded on the 30th of July 1945
