= No. 9 Squadron RNZAF =

No. 9 Squadron
- Active: 1942–1945
- Country: New Zealand
- Branch: Royal New Zealand Air Force
- Type: Bomber reconnaissance
- Engagements: World War II: Pacific theatre

No. 9 Squadron RNZAF was a New Zealand bomber reconnaissance squadron in the Pacific Theatre of World War II.

== History ==
The squadron formed as No. 9 General Reconnaissance Squadron operating Lockheed Hudson aircraft at Plaine Des Gaiacs Airfield in New Caledonia during July 1942. The squadron was assigned to Task Group 63.1. A largely American force consisting of the 69th Bomb Squadron, 67th Pursuit Squadron and two U.S. PBYs, the Task Group was tasked with patrolling the New Caledonia coast and flying air defence operations over the island. The squadron remained on New Caledonia until March 1943, when it moved forward to Palikulo Bay Airfield on Espiritu Santo. The squadron transferred to New Zealand to re-equip with Lockheed Venturas in November 1943, returning to Santo in February 1944, moving to Bougainville from May to August of that year. The squadron rotated through Fiji in January 1945, and advanced to Emirau in March. With the winding down of aerial operations against the Japanese in the South West Pacific, it was disbanded in June 1945.

== Commanding officers ==
The following officers commanded the squadron:

- Squadron Leader D. B. Grigg: July 1942 – June 1943
- Squadron Leader J. J. Busch: June–July 1943
- Squadron Leader A. C. Willis: July–August 1943
- Wing Commander A. C. Allen: October 1943 – May 1945
