= Navigation and Air Electronics Training Squadron RNZAF =

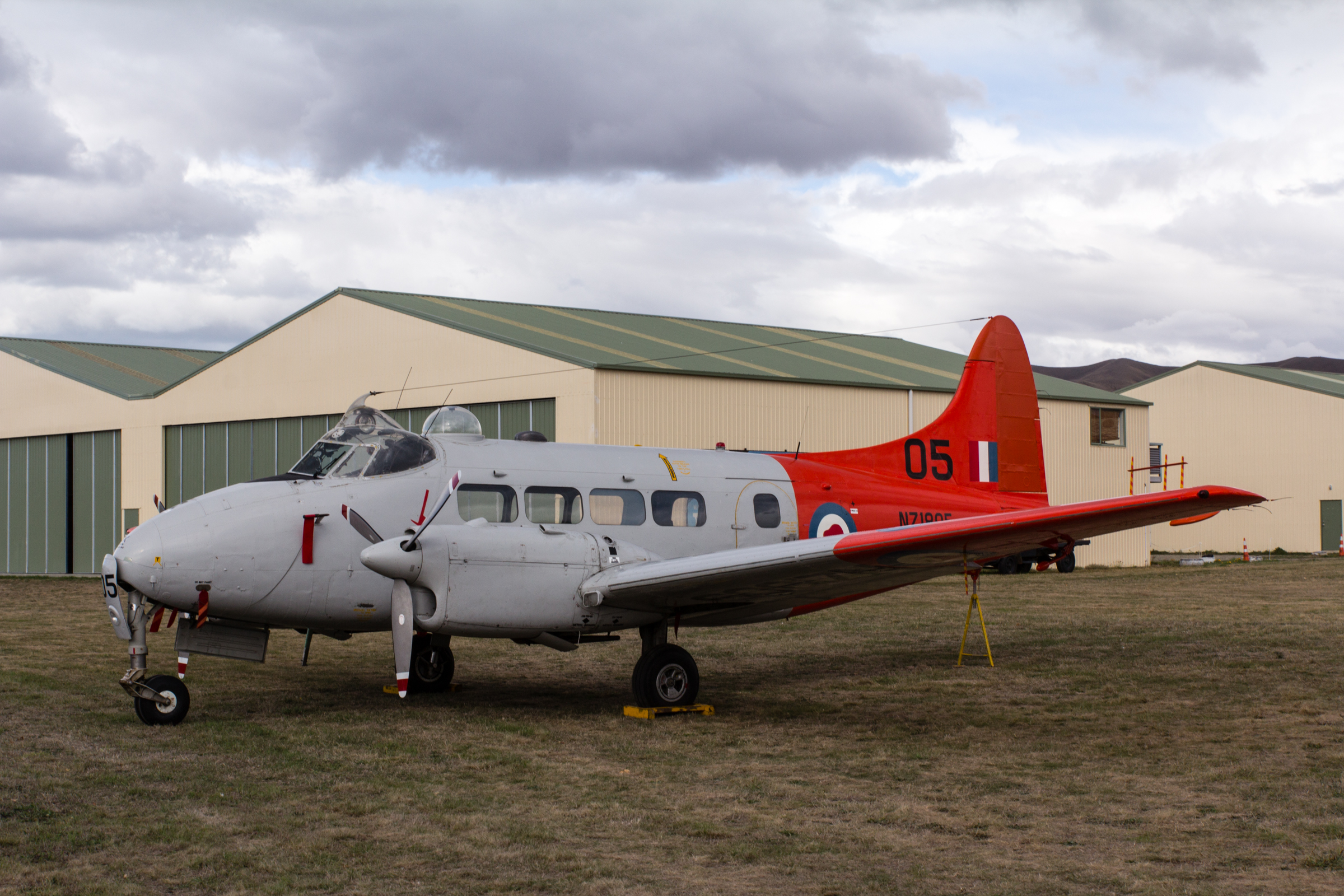
Retired RNZAF Devon NZ1805 at Omaka

The Navigation, Air Electronics, and Telecommunications Training Squadron was a training squadron of the Royal New Zealand Air Force. It was based at the now-decommissioned RNZAF Base Wigram, near Christchurch. Equipped with 3 Fokker Friendship F27 Mk120s, NATS was responsible for training Navigators (NAV), Air Engineers (AIRENG), Air Electronic Officers/Operators (AEO/AEOP) and from 1977, Telecommunications Operators.

Prior to this, it has operated a sizeable fleet (up to a dozen at one time?) of three de Havilland Devon (DH.104) variants. The first being the basic "communications" mini airliner, the next having two nav crates and an astrodome fitted, and the last, the "signals" version, sporting two radio crates for student AEOps to practice their airborne duties. While the aircraft could be operated by a single pilot, Flying Flight of NATS also had four signallers on its establishment and these grand masters of the morse key were essential equipment when the little twin pistons headed off into the cold and icy South Pacific for three hours at a time in the middle of winter. They also gave moral support to the pilot who found himself navigating in the dark on a knee pad to ensure the student passing navigational information forward was not taking him towards the South Pole instead of Wigram airfield.

NATS was deactivated in 1990.
