= No. 7 Squadron RNZAF =

- Active: February 1942 – May 1943
- Country: New Zealand
- Branch: Royal New Zealand Air Force
- Role: Reconnaissance
- Garrison/HQ: RNZAF Station Waipapakauri
- Equipment: Vickers Vincent
- Engagements: World War II

Insignia
- Squadron Code: UW

No. 7 Squadron Royal New Zealand Air Force was a New Zealand–based reconnaissance squadron of the RNZAF in World War II.

Number 7 Squadron formed under Squadron Leader A. J. Turner at RNZAF Station Waipapakauri in February 1942, in reaction to the outbreak of war with Japan. It was initially a renamed detached flight of No. 1 Squadron RNZAF, but rapidly increased in strength to 18 obsolescent Vickers Vincents. The squadron was responsible for patrols of Northland and the northern approaches. Squadron Leader Ron A. Kirkup took over the squadron in December 1942. It seems to have been planned to re-equip with Lockheed Venturas, but as the immediate threat of invasion and surface raiders passed, the squadron was disbanded in May 1943.

Squadron code letters were "UW".

== Squadron Commanding Officers ==
The following served as commanding officers of No. 7 Squadron:

- Squadron Leader A. J. Turner (February 1942–December 1942);
- Squadron Leader Ron A. Kirkup (December 1942–May 1943).
