= No. 3 Squadron RNZAF =

- No. 3 Squadron RNZAF Coat of Arms
- Active: 1930–Present
- Country: New Zealand
- Branch: Royal New Zealand Air Force
- Role: Battlefield Support, Search and Rescue, Heavy Lifting
- Garrison/HQ: RNZAF Base Ohakea
- Mottos: Maori-Kimihia Ka Patu, English – Seek and Destroy
- Colors: Red and Black
- Mascot: Crouching Māori warrior holding a Taiaha
- Equipment: NHIndustries NH90, Agusta A109
- Engagements: World War II, Vietnam War, Sinai, Bouganville Peace Monitoring Group, East Timor, Solomon Islands.
- Decorations: Meritorious Unit Citation
- Battle honours

Commanders
- Current commander: Wing Commander Greg Jane

Insignia
- Squadron Badge: Crouching Maori Warrior holding a Taiaha

No. 3 Squadron RNZAF is a unit of the Royal New Zealand Air Force (RNZAF). It currently operates NHIndustries NH90 and Agusta A109 helicopters. The squadron was initially formed as a territorial unit of the New Zealand Permanent Air Force in Christchurch in 1930. During World War II, the squadron served in the Pacific, undertaking patrol operations. In the early post war period, the squadron was converted to a Territorial formation flying fixed wing aircraft, but later converted to rotary wing aircraft, and returning to permanent status. Since then, personnel from the squadron have served in the Vietnam War, East Timor, Singapore, the Sinai, and the Solomon Islands.

== History ==
No. 3 Squadron formed as a territorial unit of the New Zealand Permanent Air Force (NZPAF) based at Christchurch in 1930. Pilots attached to the squadron used NZPAF aircraft based at Wigram until No.3 Squadron got its first aircraft Blackburn Baffin torpedo bombers, in 1938.

Following the outbreak of World War II, the unit was equipped with Vickers Vincent and Vickers Vildebeest torpedo/patrol bombers and was tasked with protecting shipping entering Lyttelton harbour. The squadron later received modern aircraft – Lockheed Hudsons – and converted to the patrol bomber role. The squadron was deployed to Palikulo Bay Airfield on Espiritu Santo on 9 October 1942, becoming operational on 16 October. On 23 November 1942, No.3 became the first RNZAF squadron deployed to the front line at Henderson Field on Guadalcanal.

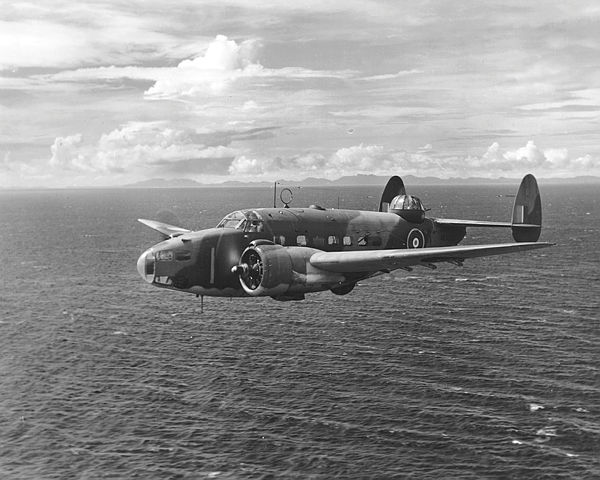
A Lockheed Hudson of No. 3 Squadron over the South Pacific, July 1943

Assigned to the Search and Patrol Group, No. 3 Squadron flew search operations on a daily basis, including night operations. In this time, sorties were flown along the approaches to Guadalcanal and around the island coastlines where it was believed the Japanese might establish staging points, replacing dive bombers and long-range heavy bombers in this role. Despite being lightly armed, a Hudson flown by Flying Officer Gudsell twice saw off attacks by three Japanese aircraft; Gudsell was awarded the US Air Medal. The squadron moved to Kukum Field on Guadalcanal and stayed there until October 1943 when it returned to Santo where it remained until January 1944. From February to March 1944 the Squadron returned to Guadalcanal, returned to Santo from May to July and deployed to Guadalcanal again from July to August 1944. The squadron re-equipped with Lockheed Venturas and in August 1944 moved to Piva Airfield on Bougainville. In October 1944, the squadron moved to Emirau where they flew interdiction patrols against Japanese shipping and ground targets. No. 3 squadron was replaced by No.4 Squadron in November 1944 and returned to New Zealand. The squadron returned to Guadalcanal from February to March 1945 and was then deployed to Green Island from March to June 1945.

From 1948 to 1957, No.3 Squadron reverted to being a territorial squadron, based at Wigram with de Havilland Tiger Moths, North American Harvards and P-51 Mustangs. It subsequently operated transport types such the Bristol Freighter and Army co-operation types such as the Auster AOP, before becoming a dedicated helicopter squadron in 1965, based at Hobsonville, Auckland, and equipped with Bell 47s, and from the end of the year Bell UH-1 Iroquois.

The squadron's Naval Support Flight flew helicopters for the Royal New Zealand Navy's frigates from 1966 until October 2005, when the role was transferred to 6 Squadron. The flight flew Westland Wasps, and later Kaman Seasprites of the naval air wing attached to the squadron from 1966 to 2005.

Pilots from No. 3 Squadron served in Vietnam and in UN peace keeping in the Sinai. The squadron served in East Timor. For many years a detachment was based in Singapore, to support the New Zealand Army presence there, and combat Indonesian insurgents. Detachments have recently served in the Solomon Islands and Antarctica.

Today, No. 3 Squadron provides tactical air transport for the New Zealand Army. The Iroquois have been replaced by NH90s.

== Current strength ==
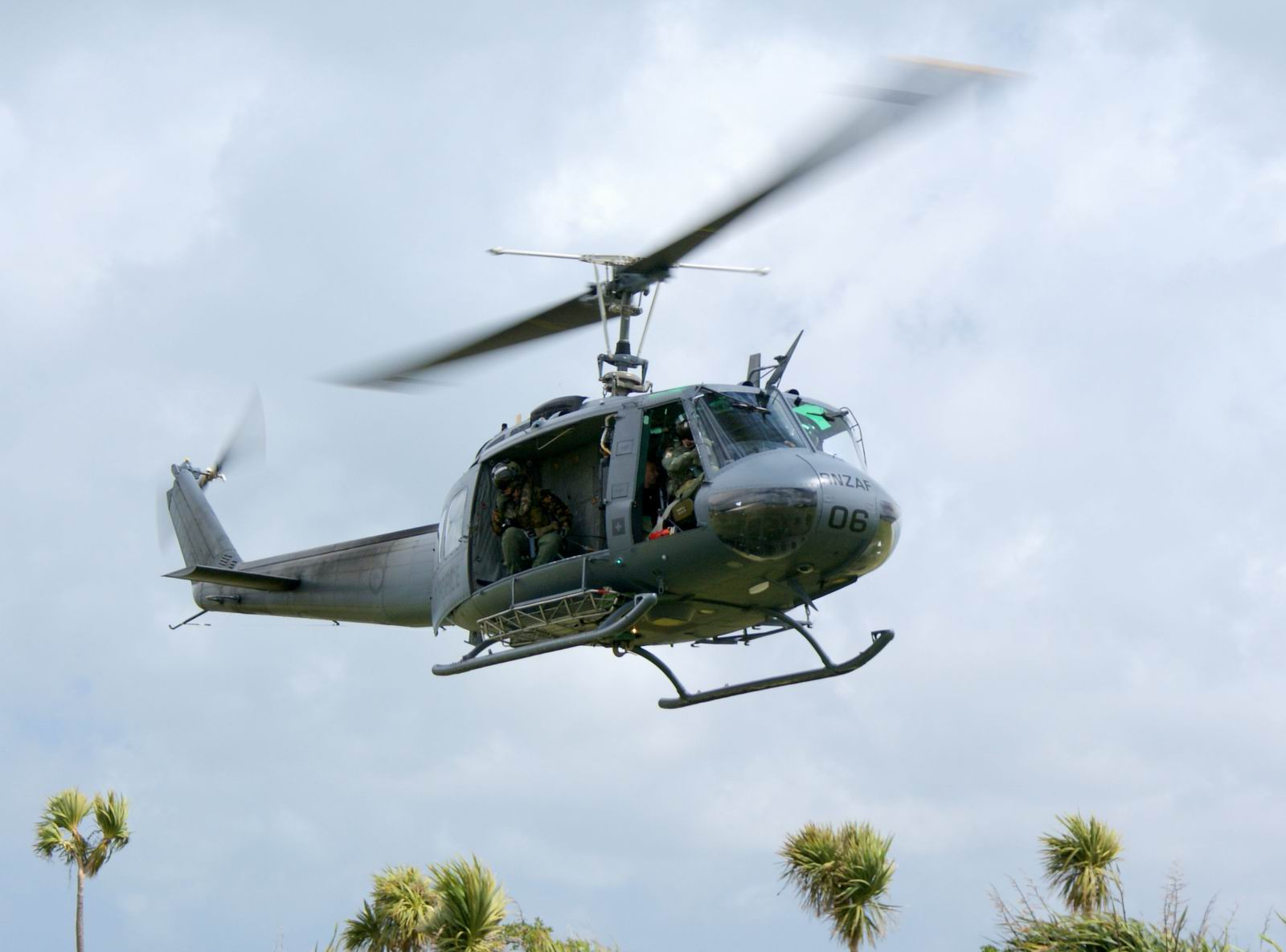
A No. 3 Squadron UH-1H Iroquois in November 2009

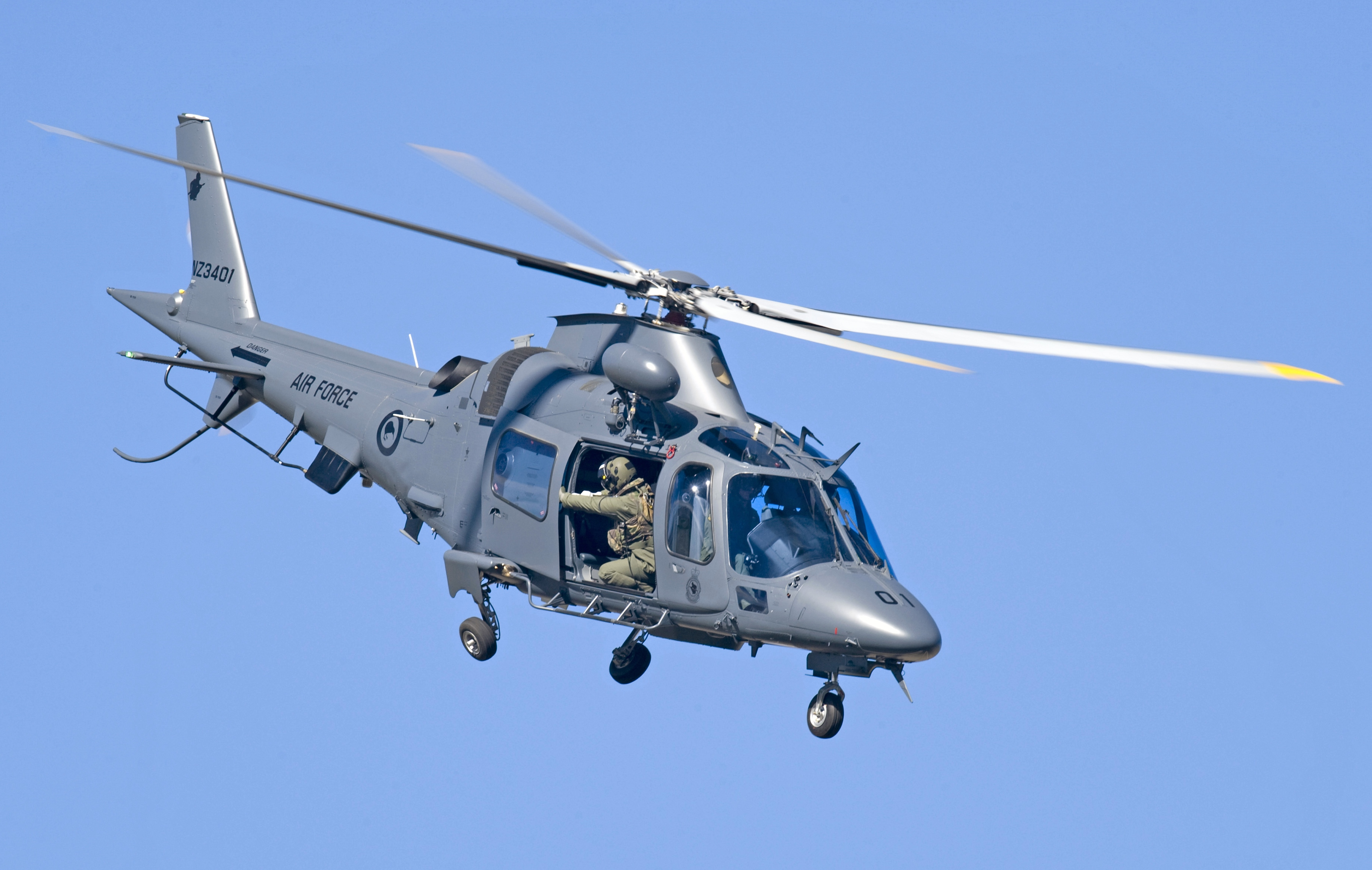
One of No. 3 Squadron's A109 helicopters in 2012

The squadron has a total personnel strength of approximately 135, and operates the following aircraft:

- Five Agusta A109 LUH helicopters (Callsign:MAKO). One extra purchased as a source for spare parts and/or an attrition airframe.
- Eight NH-90 helicopters (Callsign:WARRIOR). One NH-90 purchased used as a source of spare parts and/or an attrition airframe.

== Former helicopter fleet ==
=== Bell 47G-3B-2 Sioux ===
The first helicopters to be flown by the RNZAF, six Bell 47G-3B-1 (NZ3701 -NZ3706) were delivered in 1965. Seven Bell 47G-3B-2 (NZ3707 – NZ3713) were purchased in 1968 and delivered during 1970. All Bell 47G-3B-2 have been retired and replaced by the Agusta A109LUH since 2011.

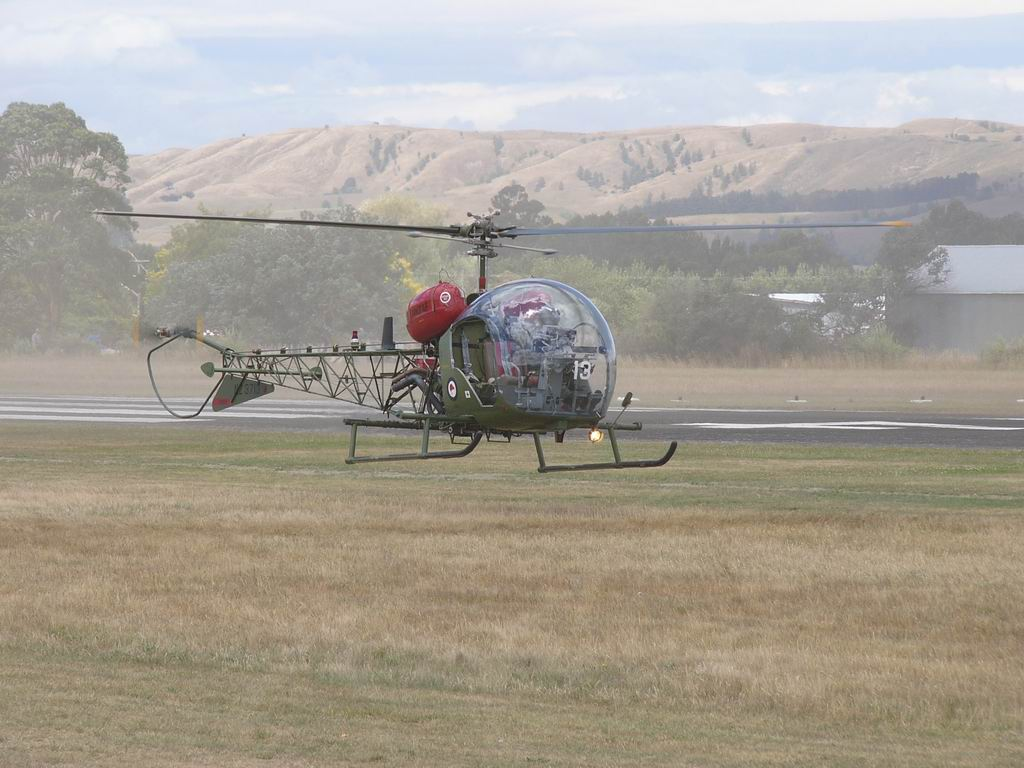
A RNZAF Sioux in 2009

=== Bell UH-1H Iroquois ===
No. 3 Squadron Iroquois NZ3802 hovering over the wreckage of Iroquois NZ3803, preparing to lift off parts of NZ3803 which crashed on the Empress Ice Shelf, near Aoraki / Mount Cook, in November 1982.

The RNZAF has retired its fleet of 16 Iroquois helicopters as of 1 July 2015. The first delivery was five UH-1D in 1966 followed in 1970 by nine UH-1H and one more UH-1H in 1976. All of the UH-1D aircraft were upgraded to 1H specification during the 1970s. Two ex-US Army UH-1H attrition airframes were purchased in 1996, one of which is in service. Three aircraft were lost in accidents.

Capacity was nine passengers or five troops with full packs or seven troops in light order. Equipment included a rescue winch, nightsun searchlight and night vision goggle capability. Armament was the M60 7.62mm, replaced by the MAG58 7.62mm.

The NH-90s took over all official duties on 1 July 2015. Following this, it was decided that 10 Bell UH-1H airframes would be advertised for sale to domestic and international purchasers and the remaining three airframes would be donated to museums around New Zealand.

On 2 March 2016, after a successful tender acquisition, the Iroquois helicopter fleet was shipped to Dakota Air Parts International, warehouse in Phoenix, Arizona. Six of the ten helicopters remain in an airworthy condition.

== Current helicopter fleet ==
=== NHIndustries NH90 ===
The NHIndustries NH90 was chosen as the primary replacement helicopter for the Bell UH-1H. The NH-90 are used to support the NZ Army, NZ Police, New Zealand Department of Conservation, assist with search and rescue, VIP duties, and heavy lifting. Nine NH-90 were acquired for NZ $70 million a helicopter in 2007 and deliveries began in 2012 with the first two helicopters arriving at RNZAF Base Ohakea. The NH-90 took over all official duties from the Bell UH-1H on 1 July 2015.

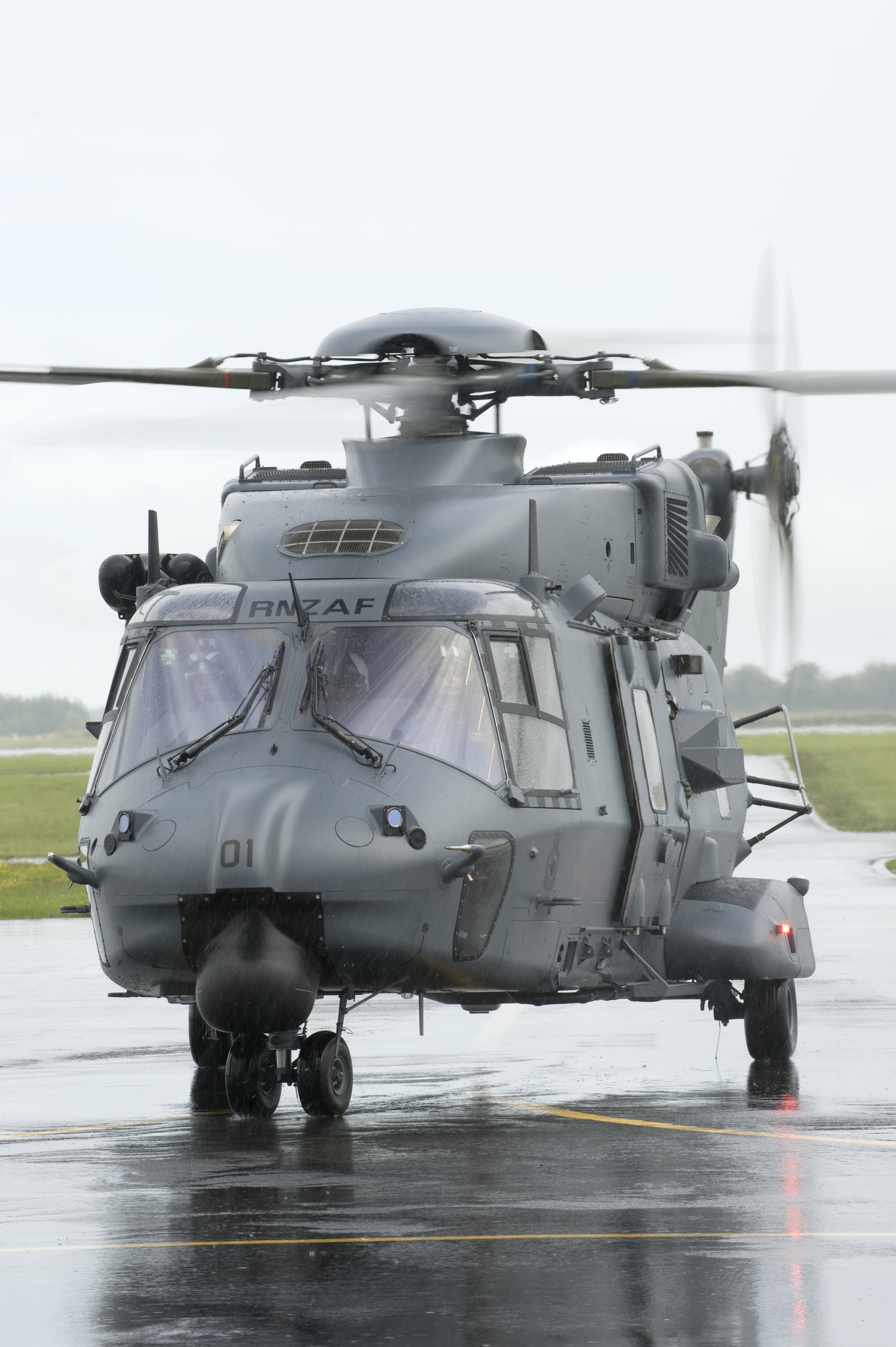
3 Squadron NH90 taxiing at RNZAF Base Ohakea

=== AgustaWestland A109LUH ===
Five AW109s were purchased by the RNZAF to replace the Bell 47 primarily in the training role for RNZAF pilots moving on to initial rotary wing training. The AW109 helicopters have also been used for other roles such as a counter terrorist platform with the NZ Army, NZ Police, VIP duties and carrying out support for NZ Customs.

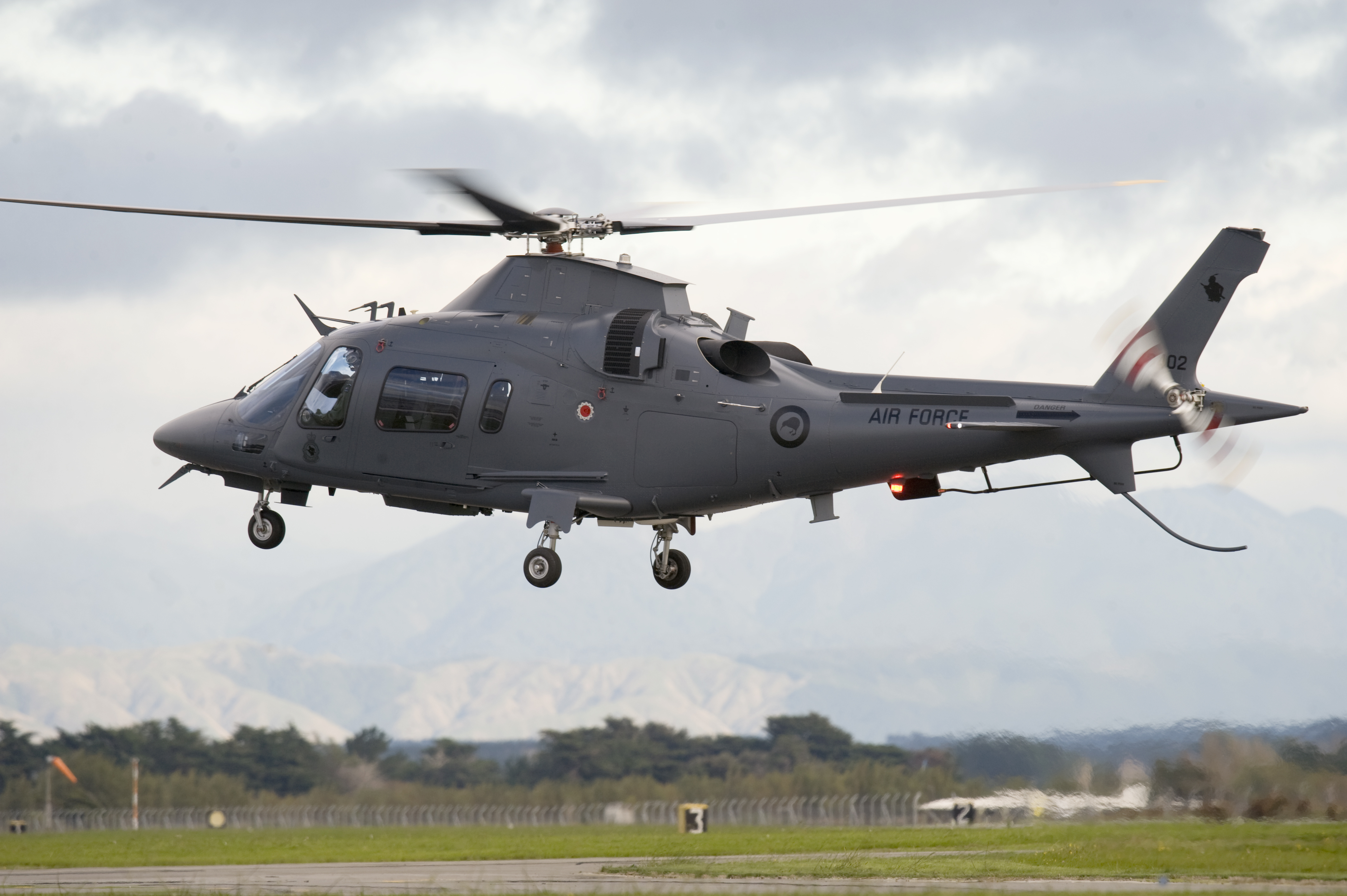
An AW109, lifts off from RNZAF Base Ohakea

== Accidents ==
In more than fifty years of service there have been few serious accidents involving the Bell UH-1H Iroquois. These include:

- NZ3810 (c/n11938 69-15650) was written off after its rotor blades clipped a sand dune during a low level tactical approach. The aircraft careered over a 70 foot high sand dune near the Kaipara Harbour on 27 April 1972 with the loss of all three lives.
- NZ3807 (c/n11706 69-15418) and NZ3814 (c/n11942 69-15654) were involved in a mid-air collision in the Shoalwater Bay Training Area, Australia, on 23 October 1981. These aircraft were rebuilt and put back into service.
- NZ3803 (c/n11707 69-15419) suffered serious damage in a ground strike on Aoraki / Mount Cook on 28 November 1982 while trying to retrieve trapped climbers during a SAR mission. One of these climbers was notable New Zealander Mark Inglis. The aircraft was subsequently rebuilt and returned to service.
- NZ3809 (c/n11708 69-15420) was badly damaged while lifting an aerial at Kaipara in July 1990.
- NZ3813 (c/n11941 69-15653) was written off in March 1995 after crashing during a low level tactical approach and overturning in the Ngamatea swamp near Waiouru. The crash was caused by an engine flame out after fuel starvation due to the fuel control unit failure. On investigation it was found that the FCU internal fuel pump drive splines had been incorrectly lubricated during a factory overhaul in the USA causing the splines to wear and fail, preventing fuel delivery to the engine. Nil fatalities.
- NZ3806 on 25 April 2010, at about 5.45 am, crashed near Paekākāriki Hill Rd, about 40 km north east of Wellington. The Iroquois was en route to Anzac Day commemorations from RNZAF Base Ohakea when the helicopter crashed into a steep hill in the morning darkness, killing three men. A fourth crew member survived the crash with serious injuries. The cause of the crash was released to the public on 16 December 2011. The Defence Force's court of inquiry into the accident found sub-standard protocols and a culture of "rule breaking" among 3 Squadron was partly to blame. The report found the crew lost situational awareness when they inadvertently flew into heavy cloud in the early-morning darkness, and did not recover in time to take evasive action. The court of inquiry made 20 recommendations – half of those directly addressed what it deemed to be the six causes of the crash.

== Preserved aircraft ==
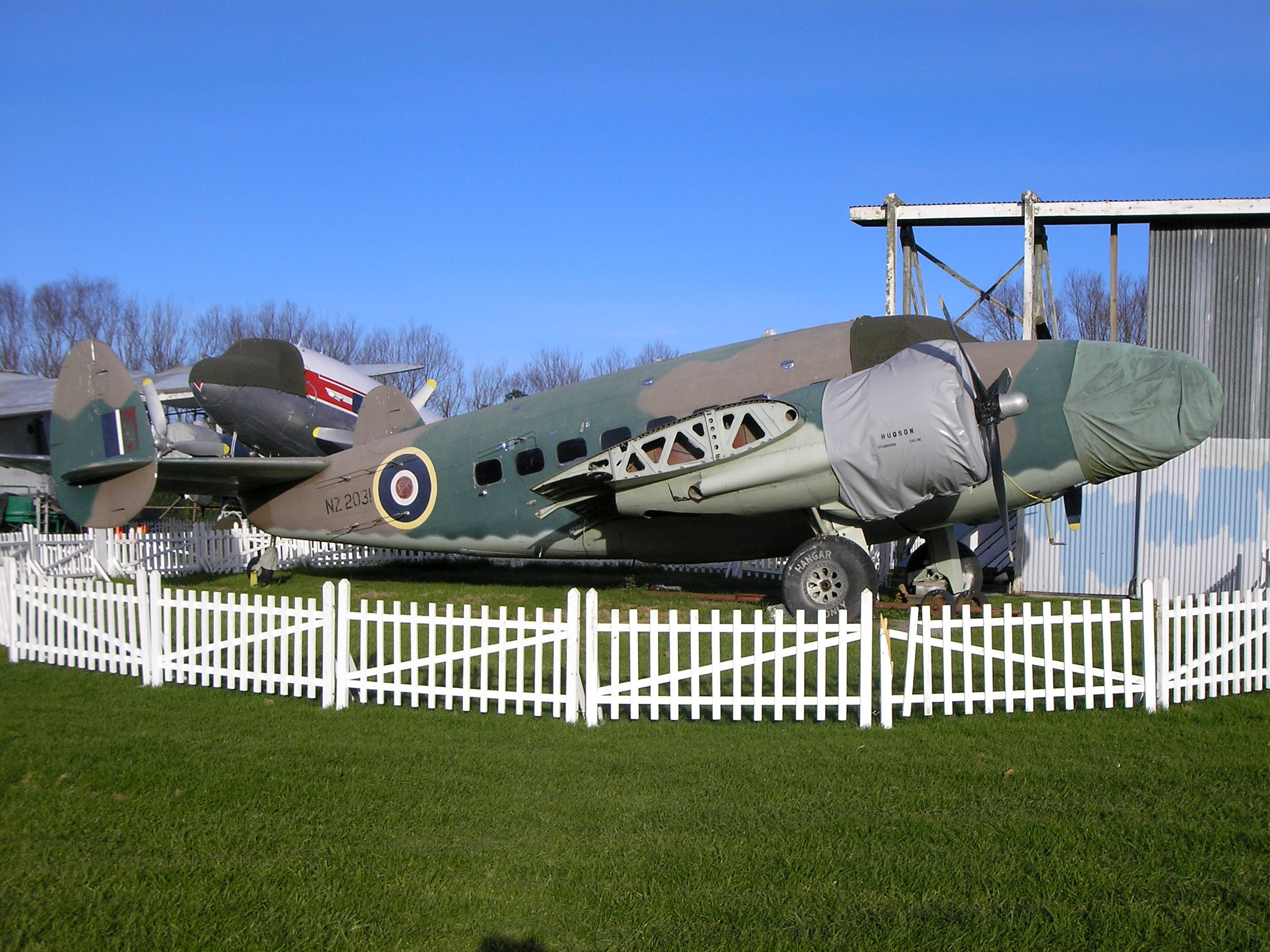
This Hudson served with 3 Squadron in 1943

An Auster AOP operated by the squadron is at the Royal New Zealand Air Force Museum, together with an Iroqouis in 3 Squadron colours, and a Westland Wasp and an early F model Kaman SH-2 Seasprite formerly operated by the squadron's naval flight. Another Wasp is preserved in the Museum of Transport and Technology, together with a Lockheed Hudson used by both No. 2 and 3 Squadrons. A number of ex-3 Squadron Bristol Freighters have survived, including one in the Royal New Zealand Air Force Museum.

Three retired Bell UH-1Hs have been given to museums around New Zealand, NZ 3801 was given to the RNZAF Museum in Christchurch which is now on display replacing the loaned US Army UH-1H, NZ 3802 was also given to the Army museum in Waiouru (to be put up on display in the near future), and NZ 3808 is on display at RNZAF Base Ohakea in the Biggin Hill hangar.
