= No. 18 Squadron RNZAF =

No. 18 Squadron
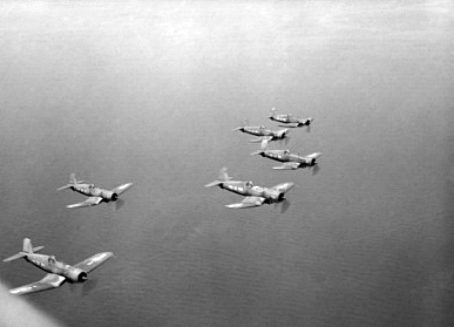
- RNZAF Corsairs over Bougainville, 1945
- Active: June 1943 – December 1945
- Country: New Zealand
- Branch: Royal New Zealand Air Force
- Type: Fighter bomber
- Size: One squadron
- Garrison/HQ: RNZAF Base Woodbourne
- Engagements: World War II: Pacific theatre

No. 18 Squadron was a squadron of the Royal New Zealand Air Force. Formed in June 1943 at RNZAF Base Woodbourne, the squadron was initially equipped with Curtiss P-40 Kittyhawks, before converting to F4U-1 Corsair fighter bombers in 1944. The squadron fought in the Pacific theatre during World War II, flying combat operations against Japanese forces until it was disbanded in late 1945.

== History ==
After being formed in June 1943 at RNZAF Base Woodbourne, No. 18 Squadron was based in New Zealand until September 1943 when it deployed to Palikulo Bay Airfield on Espiritu Santo. The following month, the squadron moved to Ondonga Airfield on New Georgia, remaining there until it returned to Santo in January 1944. The squadron deployed to Piva Airfield on Bougainville between January and March 1944 and then moved to Kukum Field on Guadalcanal in May 1944, returning to Bouganville the following month. The squadron returned to Santo in August 1944, and then moved again to Guadalcanal in September, remaining there until November. On 22 November 1944, No. 18 Squadron deployed from Guadalcanal to Green Island assuming responsibility for local patrols and "Dumbo" air-sea rescue escort missions from No. 20 Squadron RNZAF. In January 1945, the squadron returned to Guadalcanal, before being deployed the following month in support of Australian ground troops fighting the Bougainville Campaign. On Bougainville they participated in combat operations over the course of two periods: February–April 1945 and June–October 1945.

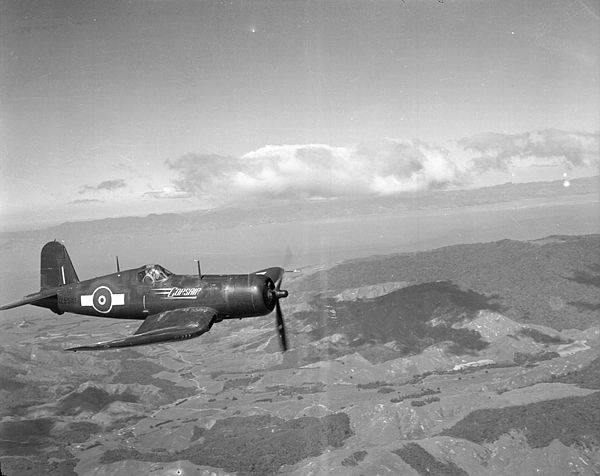
A Corsair of the Royal New Zealand Air Force, 1945

== Commanding officers ==
The following served as commanding officers of No. 18 Squadron:

- Squadron Leader J. A. Oldfield (June 1943 – March 1944);
- Squadron Leader R. H. Balfour (May–July 1944);
- Squadron Leader P. R. McNab (August–November 1944);
- Squadron Leader G. H. Corbet (November 1944 – April 1945);
- Squadron Leader W. A. Hardman (May–September 1945).
