= Luganville =

Luganville Santo
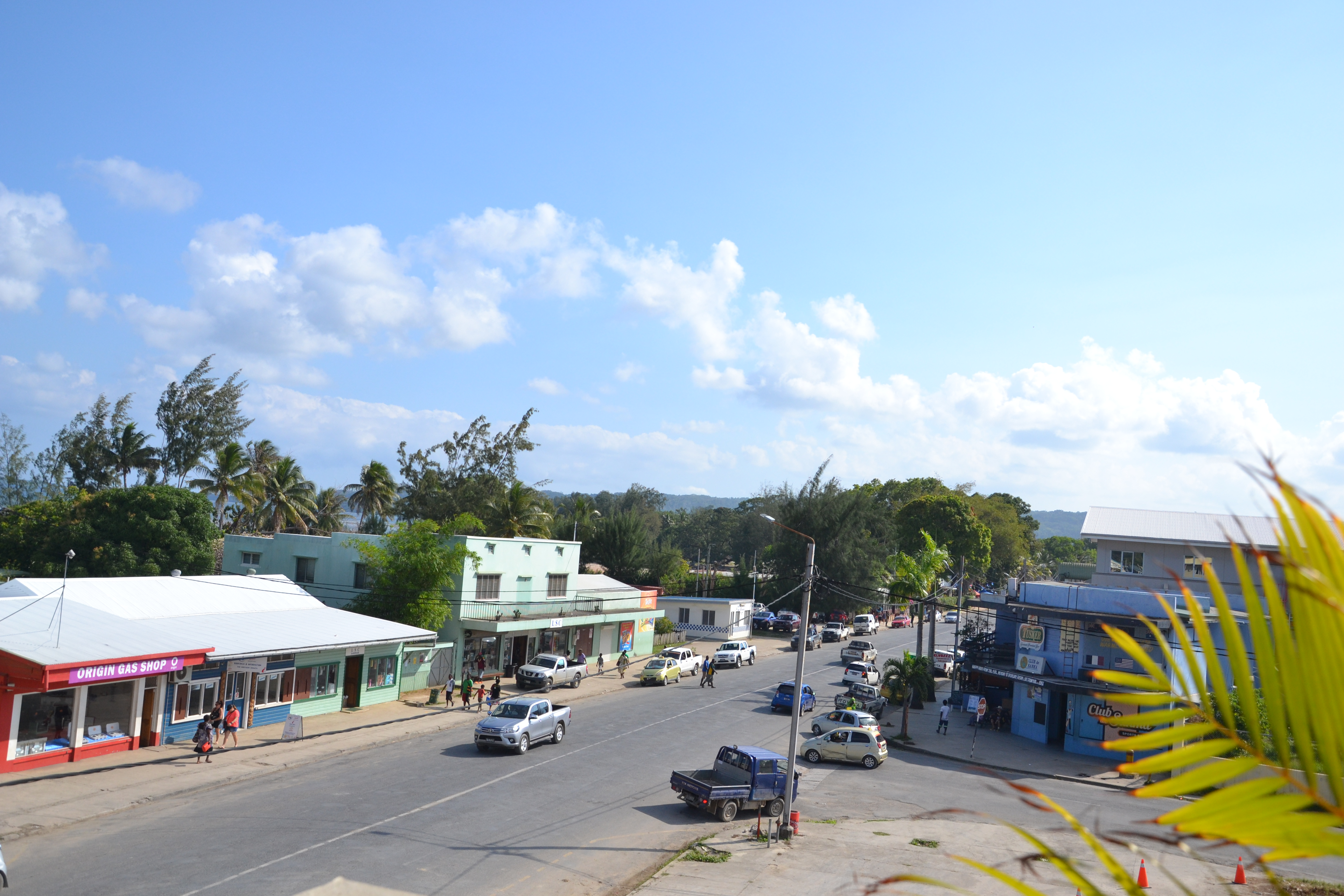
- Luganville main street Boulevard Higinson

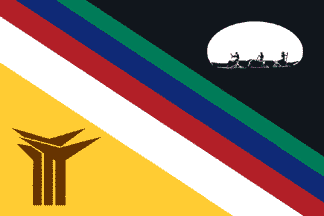
- Flag

- Location in Vanuatu
- Coordinates: 15°32′S 167°10′E
- Country: Vanuatu
- Province: Sanma Province
- Island: Espiritu Santo

Government
  - Mayor: Alan Awa (2021—present)

Area
  - Total: 8.32 km^{2} (3.21 sq mi)
- Elevation: 8 m (26 ft)

Population (2020 census)
  - Total: 17,719
  - Density: 2,130/km^{2} (5,520/sq mi)
- Time zone: UTC+11 (VUT)

Luganville is the second largest city in Vanuatu after the capital Port Vila; it is located on the island of Espiritu Santo and has a population of 17,719 as of the 2020 census. Those on Vanuatu's northern islands who regard Luganville as their big city, particularly indigenous populations, call it Santo; rural residents of Espiritu Santo call it Kanal (from the former French name "Canal du Segond"). Luganville served as a major base of operations for American troops during World War II.

Boulevard Higinson, the main street that runs through Luganville, contains mainly tourist boutiques and general stores. During WWII, the Americans used the Espiritu Santo as a military base; as a result of the occupation, Boulevard Higinson is unusually wide, as a base commander insisted that four tanks should be able to drive along the road simultaneously. At one end of Higinson is the port, one of two main ports for the island.

== History ==
=== World War II ===
During World War II, the American military erected two bases on two islands of what is now Vanuatu (a British-French colony known then as New Hebrides), one of which being Espiritu Santo. A village of small, spaced-out communities was established into one city: Luganville. Base Button is the largest U.S. base in the South Pacific, covering 38 miles, and was used mainly for maintenance and supply storage. Luganville was a major part of preparing American units for the Guadalcanal campaign. Four airfields were built; Palikulo Bay Airfield, Turtle Bay Airfield, and Luganville Airfield no longer exist, but the Bomber 3 was turned into Santo-Pekoa International Airport. Other facilities built were five military hospitals, Luganville Seaplane Base, Pontoon Wharf, a floating drydock, and thousands of Quonset huts.

Luganville is home to the South Pacific WWII Museum dedicated to preserving the history of World War II across the South Pacific region initiated in 2012 by the mayor Peter Sakita.

=== Independence ===
By the second half of the 20th century, Luganville was largely French-speaking and initially resisted the attempts to gain independence leading up to its declaration on July 30, 1980. French troops initially attempted to quash the flag-raising in Luganville, but returned to France in August instead. Some unrest arose between political parties vying for power, but has since been largely peaceful.

== Demographics ==
=== Ethnic groups ===
As of the 2016 census, 98.7% of Luganville was of Melanesian and/or Ni-Vanuatu descent. Those of non-Melanesian descent are a minority and are European, other Pacific Islander, and Asian peoples.

Part of the city is formed by squatted informal settlements such as La Milice, Mango, Pepsi, Rowok, Sarakata and St Michel. Mango was first settled by Vietnamese migrants who constructed shelters out of scrap metal left behind by the United States Army. The Vietnamese were repatriated in the 1960s and it was then occupied by Ni-Vanuatu migrants.

=== Languages ===
Luganville is a highly multilingual city, with Bislama, English and French all being widely spoken in the city. In the 2020 census, 87.8% of the city's population reported being literate in English and 52.6% in French – well higher than the national average, and higher than in Port Vila.

Among Vanuatu's 138 Indigenous languages, many are spoken in Luganville — mostly from the northern half of the archipelago — as people from rural areas come to live in the city, either temporarily or permanently. Thus, 69.8% of residents reported being able to read, and 66.4% to write, in one indigenous language.

== Economy and infrastructure ==
Luganville's economy suffered after Vanuatu declared independence in 1980. It has a strong tourist industry, namely in the areas of World War II artifacts and scuba diving (SS President Coolidge is a popular site as are the coral reefs), and is a destination for many cruise lines. Its other main industries are agriculture, cattle, and offshore financial services. The market along Boulevard Higinson is popular for its inexpensive food.

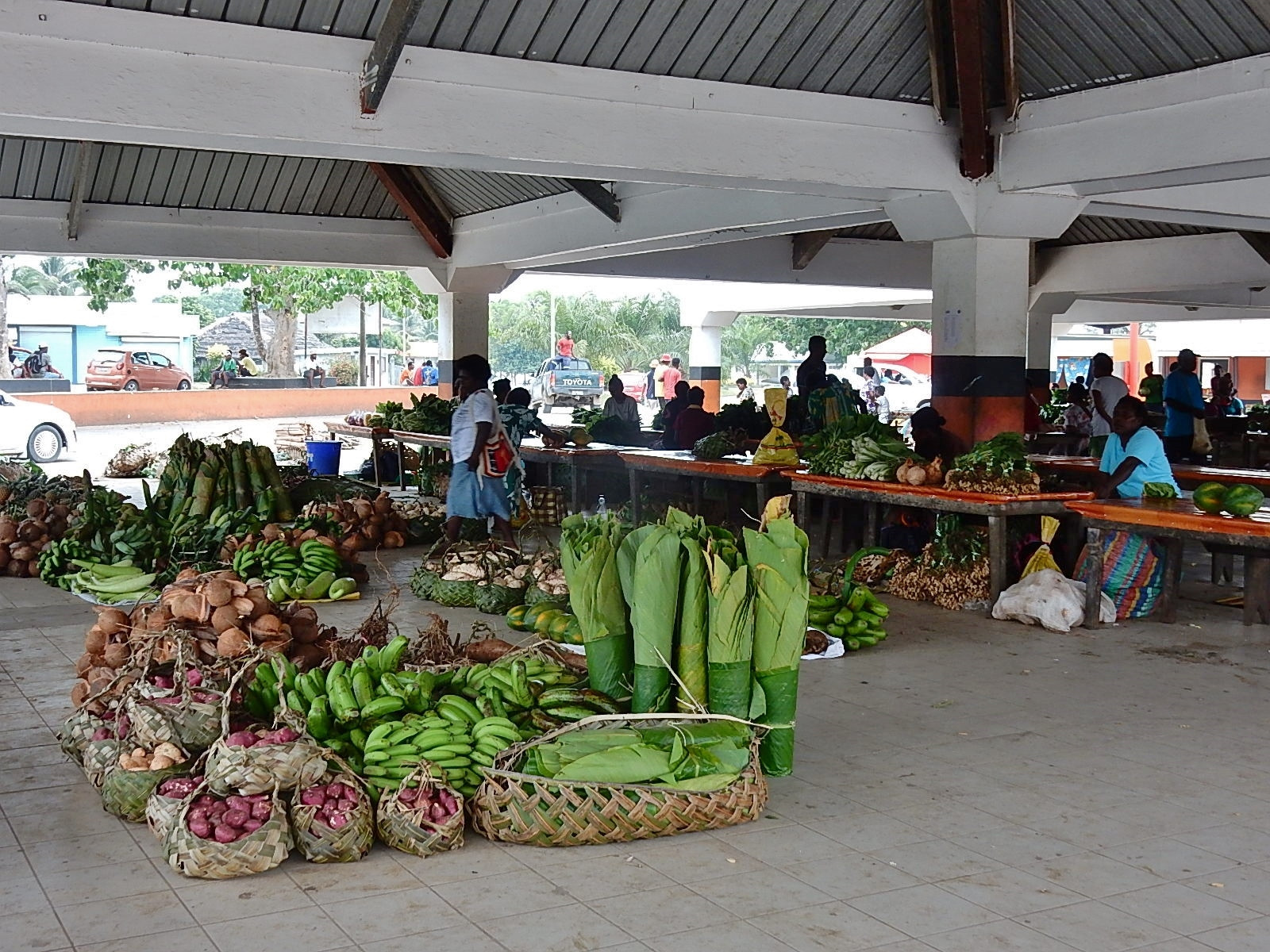
Luganville market on a Sunday afternoon.

Northern Provincial Hospital is one of two main referring hospitals on Espiritu Santo and serves people from other northern islands in Vanuatu as well as its own residents. Luganville is home to Vanuatu Health Training Institute, one of the two medical training schools on the island, but there are not enough graduates to prevent a shortage of medical professionals. Though medical expenses make up 50% of the government's budget, the hospital still relies heavily on donations.

There are six main banking organizations in Luganville: Reserve Bank of Vanuatu, Wanfuteng Bank, the National Bank of Vanuatu, Bank South Pacific, BRED Bank, and ANZ Bank.

Broadband internet was not available in Luganville until late 2006.

== Transportation ==
Luganville is one of Vanuatu's busiest ports, especially as a transshipment point for copra, coconut oil, and cacao. Canal du Segond, the body of water separating the main island and Luganville from Aore Island, provides the town with an excellent sheltered harbour. The town is served by Santo-Pekoa International Airport, the second largest airport in Vanuatu. The city is also serviced by a number of taxis, buses, and public transport trucks.

== Climate ==
Luganville features a tropical rainforest climate (Af) under the Köppen climate classification. The town features relatively constant temperatures year-round, with average temperature hovering around 25 °C or 77 °F. Average precipitation is roughly 2,920 millimetres or 110 inches annually.

Climate data for Luganville (1974–2001)
Month	Jan	Feb	Mar	Apr	May	Jun	Jul	Aug	Sep	Oct	Nov	Dec	Year
Mean daily maximum °C (°F)	30.2 (86.4)	30.2 (86.4)	30.2 (86.4)	29.5 (85.1)	28.5 (83.3)	27.7 (81.9)	27.3 (81.1)	27.3 (81.1)	27.9 (82.2)	28.6 (83.5)	29.4 (84.9)	30.0 (86.0)	28.9 (84.0)
Mean daily minimum °C (°F)	22.8 (73.0)	22.8 (73.0)	22.9 (73.2)	22.8 (73.0)	22.3 (72.1)	21.6 (70.9)	21.3 (70.3)	20.9 (69.6)	21.0 (69.8)	21.6 (70.9)	22.3 (72.1)	22.3 (72.1)	22.1 (71.7)
Average rainfall mm (inches)	287.7 (11.33)	302.1 (11.89)	260.5 (10.26)	259.7 (10.22)	169.7 (6.68)	165.4 (6.51)	92.3 (3.63)	87.1 (3.43)	99.6 (3.92)	148.6 (5.85)	180.2 (7.09)	202.6 (7.98)	2,255.5 (88.79)
Average rainy days (≥ 0.2 mm)	16	19	20	19	16	14	13	12	10	11	14	16	180
Source: World Meteorological Organization

== Twin towns – sister cities ==
Luganville is twinned with:

- – Kota Kinabalu, Sabah, Malaysia
- – Mont-Dore, New Caledonia
- – Honiara, Solomon Islands
- – Port Vila, Vanuatu
- – Honolulu, Hawaii, United States
- – Wanshan Archipelago, Guangdong, China
- – Bundaberg, Australia
