= VF-40 =

Fighter Squadron 40
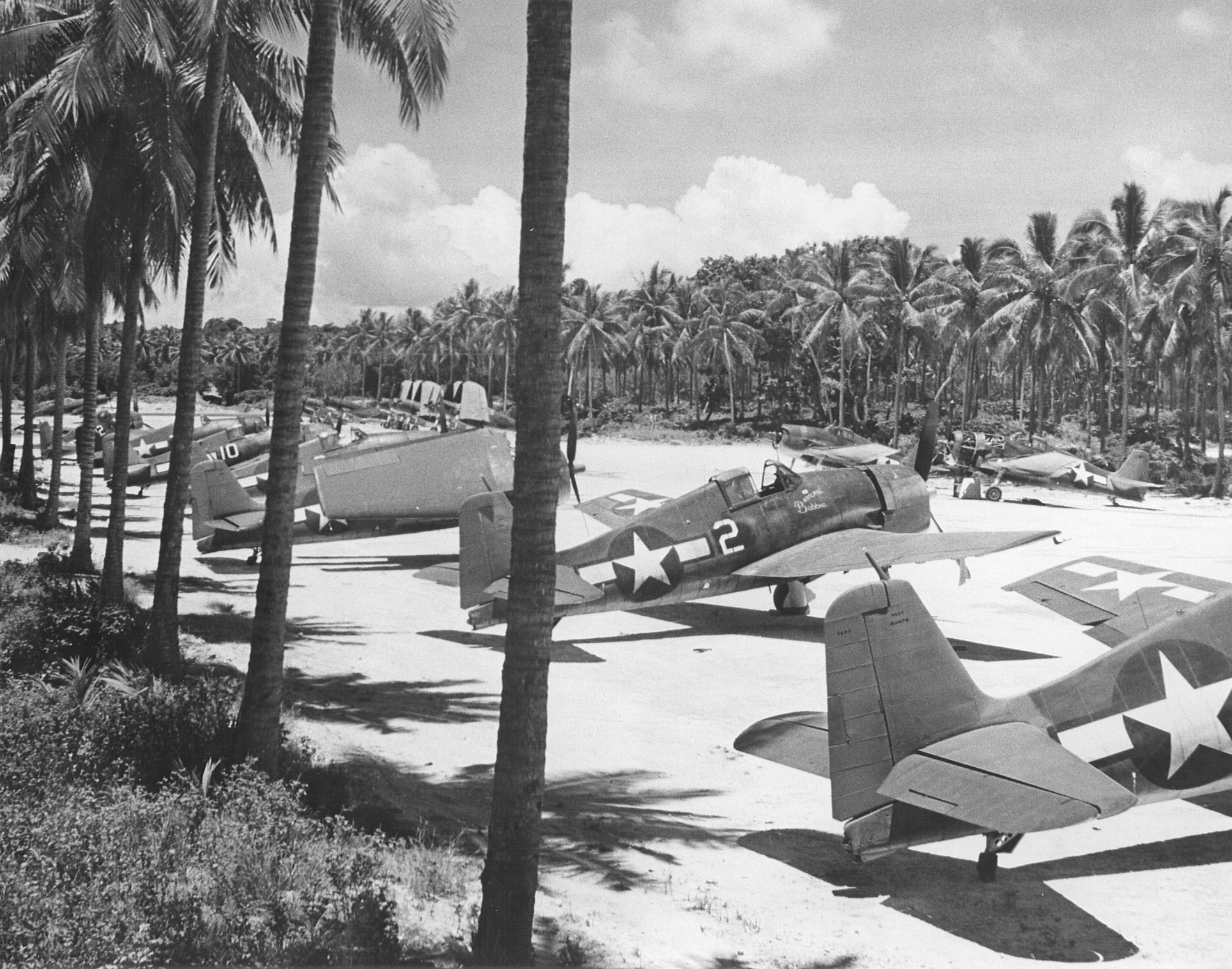
- VF-40 F6F-3s at Turtle Bay Airfield in 1944
- Active: 15 June 1943 – 19 November 1945
- Country: United States
- Branch: United States Navy
- Type: Fighter
- Engagements: World War II

Aircraft flown
- Fighter: F6F-3/-5 Hellcat

Fighter Squadron 40 or VF-40 was an aviation unit of the United States Navy. Originally established on 15 June 1943, it was disestablished on 19 November 1945. It was the only US Navy squadron to be designated as VF-40.

== Operational history ==
VF-40 equipped with the F6F Hellcat supported the New Georgia Campaign deploying to Henderson Field on Guadalcanal in September 1943. While deployed in the Solomon Islands during 1943, VF-40 shot down 4 Japanese aircraft. VF-40 later supported the Borneo campaign (1945).

== See also ==
- History of the United States Navy
- List of inactive United States Navy aircraft squadrons
- List of United States Navy aircraft squadrons
- Espiritu Santo Naval Base
