= WLH =

WLH or wlh may refer to:

- WLH, the IATA airport code for Walaha Airport, Ambae Island, Vanuatu
- WLH, the Indian Railways station code for Valha railway station, Pune, Maharashtra, India; see List of railway stations in India
- WLH, the MRT station abbreviation for Woodleigh MRT station, Singapore
- wlh, the ISO 639-3 code for Welaun language, Indonesia and East Timor
