= VPB-54 =

Patrol Bombing Squadron 54
- Active: 15 November 1942 – 7 April 1945
- Country: United States of America
- Branch: United States Navy
- Type: squadron
- Role: Maritime patrol
- Engagements: World War II

Aircraft flown
- Patrol: PBY-5A

VPB-54 was a Patrol Bombing Squadron of the U.S. Navy. The squadron was established as Patrol Squadron 54 (VP-54) on 15 November 1942, redesignated Patrol Bombing Squadron 54 (VPB-54) on 1 October 1944 and disestablished on 7 April 1945.

== Operational history ==
- 15 November 1942 – 12 February 1943: VP-54 was established at NAS Kaneohe Bay, Hawaii, as a seaplane squadron flying the PBY-5A Catalina under the operational control of FAW-2. Formation and training of the squadron continued through 11 February 1943. Although 12 aircraft was the normal complement for a squadron, 18 aircraft were on board by the end of the year. On 12 February 1943, VP-54 was ordered to convert to a night flying unit with two weeks training time prior to transfer to the combat zone.
- 1 March 1943: The first element of aircraft departed NAS Kaneohe Bay for Luganville Seaplane Base, Espiritu Santo, with the last aircraft arriving in early April. During this period of operations the squadron came under the operational control of FAW-1. While en route, four aircraft were caught at NAF Kanton Island in a surprise night raid by Japanese Mitsubishi G4M Betty attack bombers. All four Catalinas were destroyed.
- 11 March 1943: VP-54 began sending its aircraft to Henderson Field, Guadalcanal, relieving VP-12. Its duties were to conduct antishipping patrols in the Solomon Islands area in support of the forces occupying the island and Dumbo (air-sea rescue) missions in support of downed air crews. The initial landings on Guadalcanal had been made on 7 August 1942, encountering strong Japanese resistance. The island was not declared secure until 9 February 1943. Patrol tracks included Russell Islands, the southwest coast of Santa Isabel Island and the northern tip of Malaita and Savo Island.
- 5 August 1943: During the Rendova and Munda Island campaigns in the Solomons, the Japanese attempted to remove as many of their ground forces as possible from isolated garrisons. VP-54 conducted numerous anti-shipping attacks on transports during this period.
- 7 September 1943: VP-54 was based at NAB Henderson Field, Guadalcanal, with seven aircraft, NOB Espiritu Santo with one aircraft and Nouméa with three aircraft.
- 7 October 1943: VP-54 provided support for the forces attacking Vella Lavella, Solomons.
- 1 November 1943: VP-54 was tasked with providing Anti-submarine warfare (ASW) coverage, search missions and air coverage at the beginning of the Bougainville Campaign. By the end of the campaign the squadron's tour of duty drew to a close. Since arriving in the combat theater the squadron had recovered 52 personnel from the water, including downed pilots and survivors of ship sinkings.
- 20 November 1943: VP-54 was relieved and flew its aircraft to Sydney, Australia. The aircraft remained at Sydney while the squadron personnel were returned to the U.S. aboard ship. After a period of home leave, a cadre of personnel were given orders to report to NAS San Diego, California, for reforming the squadron.
- 6 February 1944: VP-54 was reformed at NAS San Diego under the operational control of FAW-14, with new PBY-5A aircraft to replace the ones left in Australia. By May the squadron had fully integrated its new personnel and equipment and was ready for redeployment.
- 20 May 1944: VP-54 departed NAS San Diego in elements of three aircraft, with the last arriving at NAS Kaneohe Bay on 21 May 1944. The remainder of the squadron and its assets were sent to Hawaii aboard USS Breton. Upon arrival at NAS Kaneohe Baythe squadron came under the operational control of FAW-2.
- 28 May 1944: A detachment of six aircraft and nine crews was deployed to Midway Island until 2 July 1944, conducting routine operational patrols. The remaining squadron assets at NAS Kaneohe Bay continued to perform routine patrols in Hawaiian waters.
- 8 July 1944: VP-54 deployed to Guadalcanal in three-plane sections, leaving NAS Kaneohe Bay every other day. The first section arrived at Espiritu Santo on 12 July, continuing on to Carney Field, Guadalcanal, to relieve VP-81. During this period the squadron came under the operational control of FAW-1.
- 31 July 1944: VP-54 was relocated to Luganville Airfield, Espiritu Santo, relieving VP-12. A detachment of four PBY-5As was maintained at Henderson Field, Guadalcanal, for duty with the 2nd Marine Air Wing through 10 September 1944. The squadron aircraft at Luganville conducted routine ASW patrols and Dumbo searches.
- 13 September 1944: VP-54 deployed 13 aircraft and 15 crews to Emirau. Two aircraft were sent to Funafuti. Both detachments returned to Espiritu Santo on 21 September 1944.
- 22 September 1944: Long-range navigation over large areas of the ocean was difficult for large aircraft with a full-time navigator and extremely difficult for single-seat fighters. The Navy was frequently called upon by the Army Air Forces to provide seaplane escorts for fighter groups making long transits between island bases. The presence of amphibious Navy aircraft also ensured a quick rescue in the event of ditching. VP-54 conducted such a mission on 22 September, escorting the Western Caroline Air Force from Emirau to Peleliu Airfield, staging through Hollandia and Owi Airfield.
- 24 September 1944: A three-aircraft element was sent on a night search for enemy shipping in the passage north of Peleliu.
- 1 October 1944: VP-54 was redesignated VPB-54. On this date, the squadron provided an escort for Marine squadrons being transferred from Emirau to Palau.
- 4 November 1944: A detachment of six aircraft and crews remained at Peleliu Island, Palau, for Dumbo missions. The other seven squadron aircraft remained at Espiritu Santo.
- 10 November 1944: VPB-54 was relieved by No. 5 Squadron RNZAF, but lacking further orders remained at Espiritu Santo until mid-December.
- 12–23 December 1944: The seven aircraft of the Espiritu Santo detachment of VPB-54 were relocated to Los Negros Island. On 23 December 1944, the detachment relieved VPB-34 for air-sea rescue and evacuation work. Tender support at Leyte Gulf was provided by USS Orca under the operational control of FAW-10.
- 27 December 1944 – 10 January 1945: VPB-23 relieved the squadron's Peleliu detachment, but its aircraft were too worn out to be able to rejoin the squadron at Leyte Gulf. The six aircraft were first flown to Woendi for overhaul on 1 January 1945. The work was completed a week later and the detachment flew into Leyte on 10 January 1945. Upon arrival the detachment was put aboard USS Tangier, while the remaining five aircraft and eight crews of the former Leyte detachment departed aboard USS Orca for duty in Lingayen Gulf.
- 22 January 1945: The six aircraft and crews aboard USS Tangier were relocated to USS San Carlos and continued operations in Leyte Gulf.
- 14 February 1945: The Lingayen Gulf detachment was relieved by VPB-17 and then returned to Leyte Gulf to rejoin the rest of the squadron. USS Currituck provided this group tender support.
- 17 February 1945: VPB-54's tour of duty formally concluded with its relief at Leyte Gulf by VPB-17. Three of the squadron aircraft were flown to Manus Island for transportation to the U.S. The remaining crews departed from Samar Island via Naval Air Transport Service, returning to the continental U.S. The support staff and ground crews boarded USS Wharton for return to the States.
- 24 February – 13 March 1945: The commanding officer and aircrew personnel reported to COMFAIRALAMEDA and FAW-8 at NAS Alameda, California. On 13 March 1945, prior to the arrival of the ground crews and support staff, all personnel were given reassignment orders sending them to other squadrons.
- 7 April 1945: VPB-54 was disestablished at NAS Alameda.

== Aircraft assignments ==
The squadron was assigned the following aircraft, effective on the dates shown:

- PBY-5A - 15 November 1942

== Home port assignments ==
The squadron was assigned to these home ports, effective on the dates shown:

- NAS Kaneohe Bay, Hawaii - 15 November 1942
- NAS San Diego, California - December 1943
- NAS Kaneohe Bay - 21 May 1944
- NAS Alameda, California - 24 February 1945

== See also ==
- Maritime patrol aircraft
- List of inactive United States Navy aircraft squadrons
- List of United States Navy aircraft squadrons
- List of squadrons in the Dictionary of American Naval Aviation Squadrons
- History of the United States Navy
