= Sarakata River =

River in Vanuatu

Coordinates: 15°36′9″S 166°51′51″E

The Sarakata is one of the longest rivers of Vanuatu. It flows into Velit Bay to the west of Luganville on the southeast of the island of Espiritu Santo. Unity Park on the Segond Channel near the mouth of the river was the location of John F. Kennedy's PT-109 base while awaiting transfer to the Solomon Islands during World War II. The Japanese are planning a hydroelectric power station in the vicinity.
