= VMFA-251 =

United States Marine Corps fighter attack squadron

Marine Fighter Attack Squadron 251
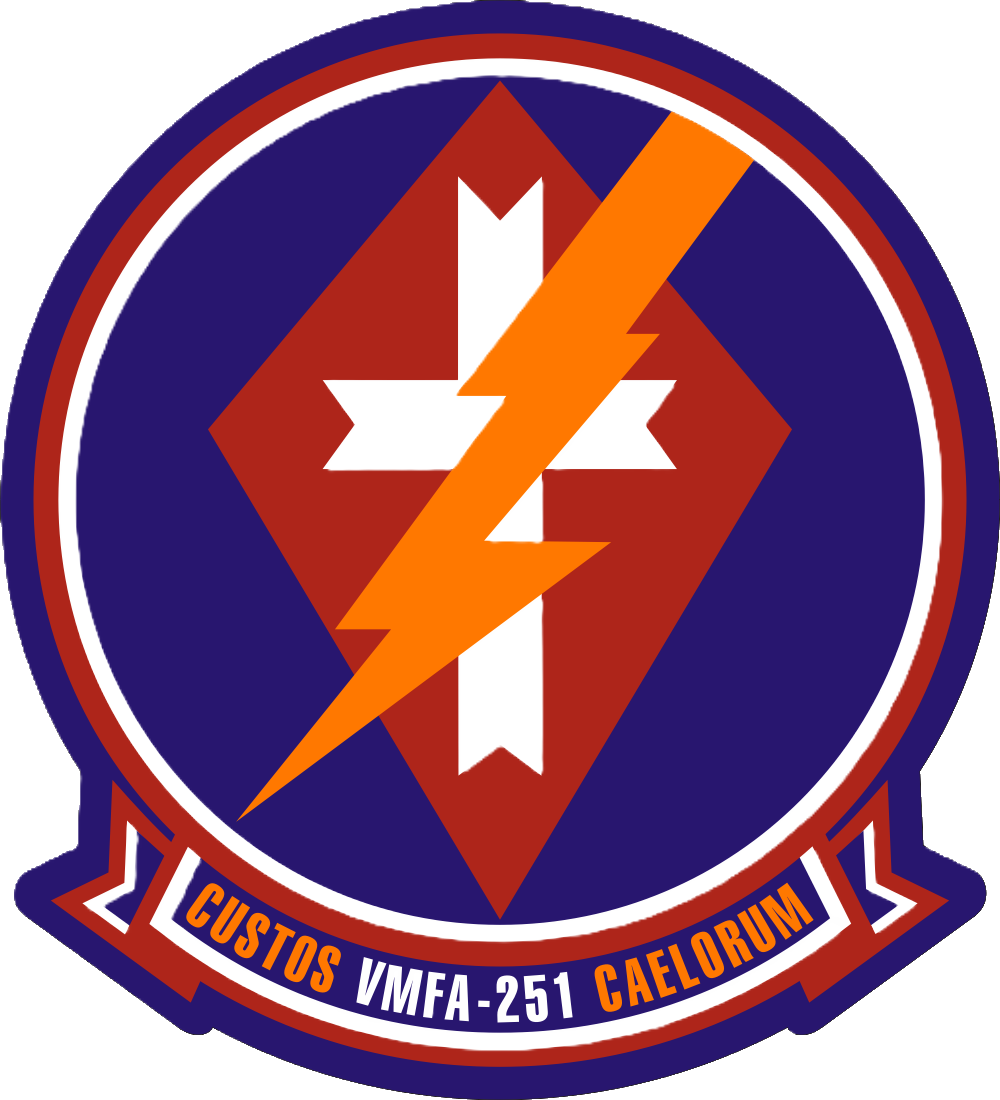
- Active: 1 December 1941 – 1 June 1945; 1 July 1946 - 23 April 2020; 5 December 2024 - Active
- Country: United States of America
- Branch: United States Marine Corps
- Type: Fighter/Attack
- Role: Close air support Air interdiction Aerial reconnaissance
- Part of: Marine Aircraft Group 14; 2nd Marine Aircraft Wing
- Garrison/HQ: Marine Corps Air Station Cherry Point
- Nicknames: Thunderbolts; Lucifer's Messengers (WWII - 1945)
- Mottos: "Custos Caelorum" "Guardians of the Sky" "Squadron of Firsts"
- Tail Code: DW
- Mascot: Thunderbolt
- Engagements: World War II; Battle of Guadalcanal; Philippines campaign (1944–45); Korean War; Operation Deny Flight; Operation Provide Promise; Global war on terrorism; Operation Enduring Freedom; Operation Iraqi Freedom; 2003 invasion of Iraq

Commanders
- Commanding Officer: LtCol Andrew P Cody [Lucky]
- Sergeant Major: SgtMaj Ashley C. Harrod

Aircraft flown
- Attack: AD-4 Skyraider
- Fighter: F4F Wildcat; F4U Corsair; FJ-3 Fury; F8U Crusader; F-4 Phantom II; F/A-18A/C Hornet; F-35C Lightning II

Marine Fighter Attack Squadron 251 (VMFA-251) is a United States Marine Corps F-35C Lightning II squadron. Known as the "Thunderbolts", the squadron is based at Marine Corps Air Station Cherry Point, North Carolina. The squadron's aircraft use the callsign T-Bolt or Sword.

== History ==
=== World War II ===
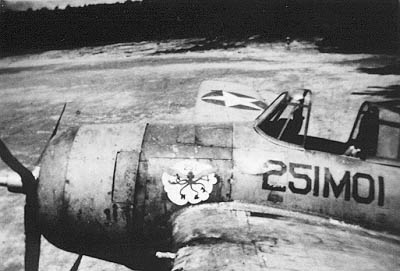
A VMO-251 F4F-3P on Espiritu Santo, 1942.

Marine Observation Squadron 251 (VMO-251) was commissioned 1 December 1941 at Naval Air Station North Island, California. In mid-1942 it was transferred to Tontouta, New Caledonia and then to Turtle Bay Airfield on the island of Espiritu Santo in the British-French Condominium of New Hebrides prior to the invasion of Guadalcanal. While flying the Grumman F4F Wildcat during World War II, the squadron participated in numerous Pacific campaigns including Guadalcanal, Southern Solomons, Santa Cruz, Luzon, and the Southern Philippines.

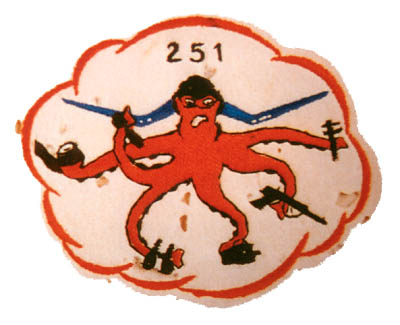
Squadron insignia when they were VMO-251

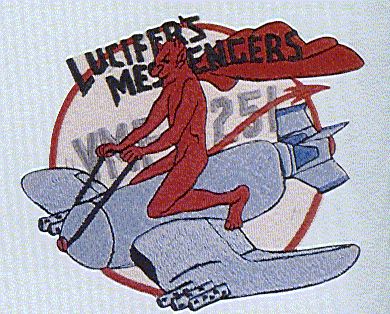
Squadron patch from when they were VMF-251

In 1943, the squadron transitioned to the F4U Corsair, and was re-designated Marine Fighter Squadron 251 (VMF-251) in February 1945. 22 F4U Corsairs from the squadron landed on Samar on 2 January 1945 as part of Marine Aircraft Group 14 (MAG-14) and continued operations in the Philippines until 1 May 1945 when it flew its last combat mission of World War II while supporting clean-up operations at Leyte. The squadron's excellent performance during this time can be drawn from an award write up by the then Commanding Officer of MAG-14, Colonel Zebulon Hawkins, in which he noted, "During the month of January 1945 . . . this squadron [23 planes] flew 626 combat flights, totaling 2,403 hours. Since... 1 October 1944, until 15 February 1945, this... ground crew has maintained in commission 98% of the squadron's assigned aircraft. Not once, from June 1944, has it failed to execute an assigned mission because of failure to have the necessary planes in commission... Since 23 July 1944... this squadron has not lost a plane or pilot because of failure or malfunctioning of its aircraft."

On 1 June 1945, VMF-251 was deactivated at Samar, Philippines Island. Thirteen months later on 1 July 1946, VMF-251 was reactivated at Grosse Ile, Michigan as a ready-reserve squadron.

=== Korean War ===
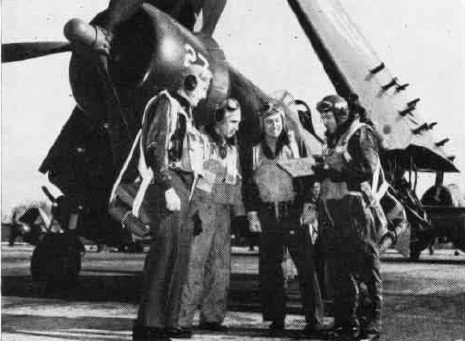
VMF-251 pilots at NAS Grosse Ile, 1948.

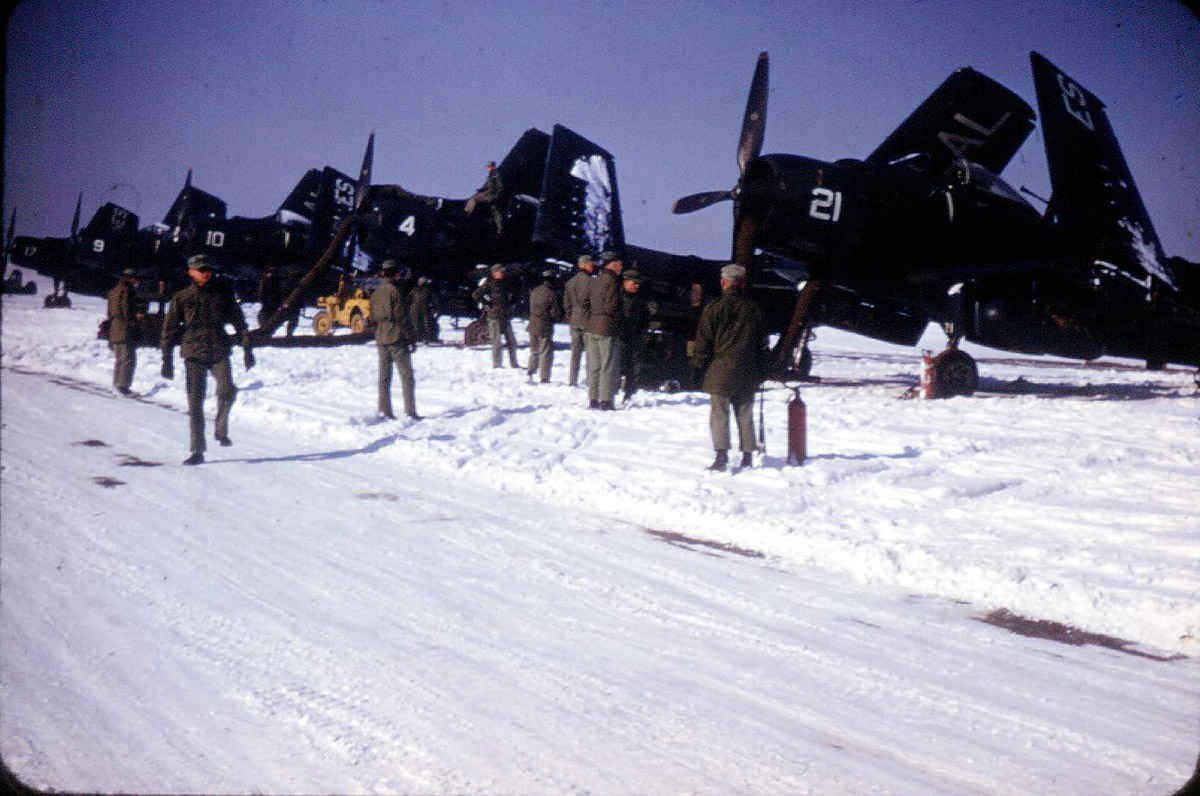
AD-4s of VMA-251 in Korea, 1953-54.

With the outbreak of the Korean War in 1950, VMF-251 was recalled to active service and directed to transition to the AD-4 Skyraider. In late April 1951 the squadron was transferred to Marine Corps Air Station El Toro, California. With the aircraft transition complete, the squadron was re-designated Marine Attack Squadron 251 (VMA-251) on April 20, 1951. VMA-251 embarked to Korea in June 1953. Although the squadron only saw action the last two weeks of the war, it flew 310 combat sorties totaling more than 550 hours and had the distinction of having the last Marine aircraft engaged in combat during the Korean War on 27 July 1953. VMA-251 remained in Korea for two and a half years providing air defense along the Korean Demilitarized Zone.

In January 1956, the Black Patches relocated to Marine Corps Air Station Iwakuni, Japan and remained in the Far East for fifteen months. In 1957, VMA-251 was again relocated to Marine Corps Air Station Miami, Florida flying the FJ-3 Fury. With the transition to the FJ-3 came the re-designation to VMF-251 on April 20, 1957. The squadron changed their nickname from Black Patches to Thunderbolts and a new insignia was created by Captain (LtGen, Ret.) Richard E. Carey. The insignia consisted of a white cross (symbolizing purity), a red diamond (depicting courage), and a blue field (loyalty). Their motto became, Custos Caelorum, or Guardians of the Sky. The squadron also adopted the "DW" tail code.

In April 1958 VMF-251 was moved to Marine Corps Air Station El Toro, California to receive its first supersonic fighter, the F8U Crusader. The Thunderbolts departed MCAS El Toro for NAS Atsugi, Japan, in October 1959, with LtCol. Albert L. Clark leading the way. The squadron practiced Carrier Qualifications aboard the USS Oriskany and the USS Ranger. They also participated in operations in Formosa, the Philippines, and Okinawa. Captain Joseph F. Mayfield, Jr. was lost on 27 May 1959 and Captain Robert L. Leathers was lost at sea on 18 November 1960.

=== Cold War ===
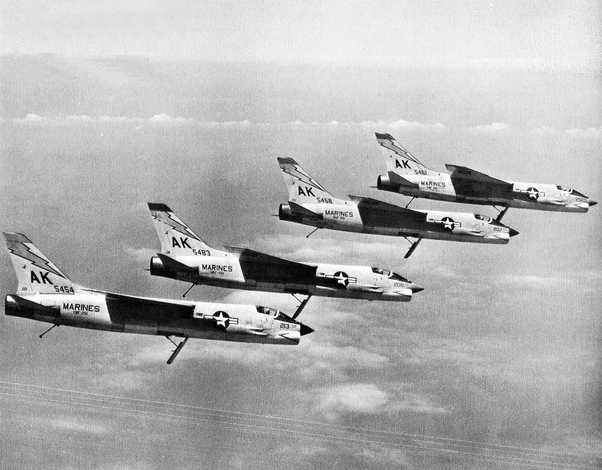
VMF-251 F-8B Crusaders, assigned to USS Shangri-La (CVA-38), in 1962.

In 1961, VMF-251 was assigned to Marine Aircraft Group 31 (MAG-31) at Marine Corps Air Station Beaufort, South Carolina. In August and September 1961 the squadron was deployed to Guantanamo Bay, Cuba and to Jamaica during the time between the Bay of Pigs Invasion and the Cuban Missile Crisis. From February through August 1962, VMF-251 was the first Marine F-8 squadron to deploy on board an aircraft carrier as part of Carrier Air Group Ten on the USS Shangri-La (CVA-38). During the cruise, VMF-251 set the record for the most flight time in one month for a Sixth Fleet based F-8 squadron by flying over 500 hours. In July 1963 the Thunderbolts were the recipients of the 2nd MAW Commanding General's award for achievement in competitive exercises which took place while the squadron was deployed to NAS Roosevelt Roads, Puerto Rico.

On 31 October 1964, the Thunderbolts became the first Marine squadron in 2nd Marine Aircraft Wing to transition to the F-4 Phantom II and receive its current designation as Marine Fighter Attack Squadron 251 (VMFA-251). The Thunderbolts received the CNO's flight safety award in 1967 and again in 1969 as well as the Fleet Marine Force Atlantic safety award for the years 1967, 1968 and 1970. In 1969 they also received the Robert M. Hanson award, presented annually to the "most outstanding Marine fighter squadron of the year." Training exercises were conducted in Puerto Rico in 1964-1965, 1971, and 1973. In April 1971 the squadron stood "hot pad" duty at Naval Air Station Key West, Florida and provided additional support for the North American Air Defense Command. Further deployments in support of NATO were made to Cigili Air Base, Turkey in 1973 and to Rota, Spain in 1975 and the Thunderbolts participated in a Western Pacific deployment to Japan, Korea, and the Philippines during 1977-1978.

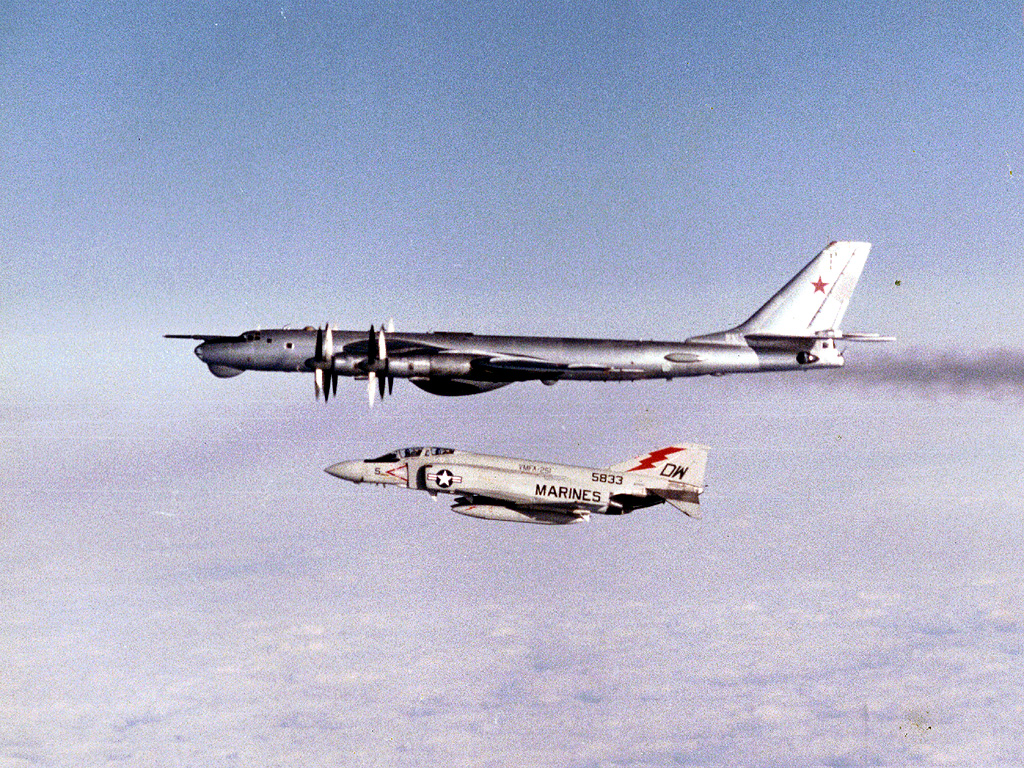
A VMFA-251 F-4J intercepts a Soviet Tu-95 Bear D in 1982.

In September 1980 the Thunderbolts deployed to Trondheim in the Kingdom of Norway in support of NATO Exercises. In April 1982, the Thunderbolts again deployed to Keflavik in Iceland where the squadron intercepted six Soviet Bear Bombers while on "hot pad" alert. The squadron deployed to the Kingdom of Denmark in September 1982 for NATO Exercise "Northern Wedding 82" during which 102 Soviet aircraft flew sorties against NATO naval forces. The squadron was placed on alert for possible redeployment to Lebanon before returning to the United States.

After twenty-one years and 85,000 flight hours, VMFA-251 flew its last F-4S Phantom in November 1985. In January of the following year, the Thunderbolts transitioned to the F/A-18 Hornet. The squadron stood up as the sixth Marine F/A-18A squadron the following August and reported full combat ready in March 1987.

=== The 1990s ===
The squadron transitioned from the aging F/A-18A to the F/A-18C during the early 1990s. This change also increased the squadron's mission capable rate.

From January to April 1994, the Thunderbolts flew close air support missions while deployed to Aviano, Italy supporting Operation Deny Flight in Bosnia-Herzegovina. These missions marked the first combat sorties for a Marine squadron in Europe since World War I. In 1994, the squadron became part of the Navy's Carrier Air Wing One and deployed as part of the USS America and USS George Washington battle groups from 1995 through 1997. The squadron then deployed on board the USS John F Kennedy (CV-67) during 1999-2000 for OPERATION SOUTHERN WATCH.

=== Global war on terror ===
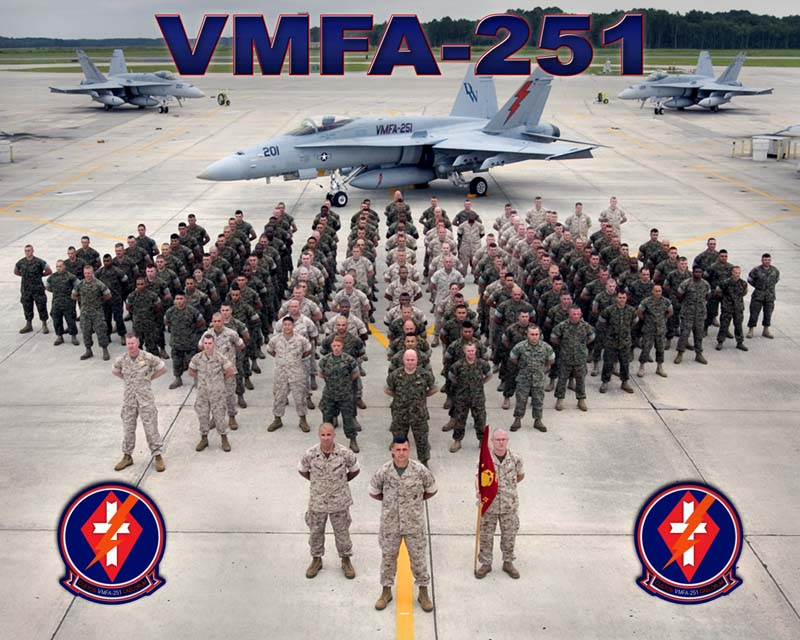
2005 squadron photo

After the September 11 attacks, VMFA-251 deployed aboard USS Theodore Roosevelt on 19 September 2001 with Carrier Air Wing One (CVW-1). On 15 October 2001, the strike group entered the North Arabian Sea, joining the already-present Enterprise and Carl Vinson in conducting attacks against al-Qaeda in Afghanistan for Operation Enduring Freedom. Departing Norfolk on 19 September 2001 Theodore Roosevelt and CVW-1 spent 159 consecutive days at sea, breaking the record for the longest period underway since World War II.

On 12 February 2003, the squadron deployed to Ahmed Al Jaber Airbase, Kuwait as part of Marine Aircraft Group 11, 3rd Marine Aircraft Wing in support of Operation Iraqi Freedom (OIF). On 20 February 2003, the squadron began flying combat missions in support of Operation Southern Watch and then transitioned to combat operations in support of OIF on 20 March 2003. During the conflict Thunderbolts flew over 650 combat missions over Iraq, accumulating more than 1,200 combat flight hours and dropped more than 7,100 weapons amounting to approximately 832,000 pounds of ordnance. Throughout the deployment maintenance Marines performed over 8,000 maintenance man-hours resulting in a 76% full mission capable rate.

In 2006 the squadron deployed to Al Asad, Iraq in support of Operation Iraqi Freedom (OIF). Upon their return they again deployed, this time on board the USS Enterprise (CVN-65). They were away from June to December 2007 and flew combat sorties in support of OIF and Operation Enduring Freedom (OEF) in Afghanistan.

=== Reactivation ===
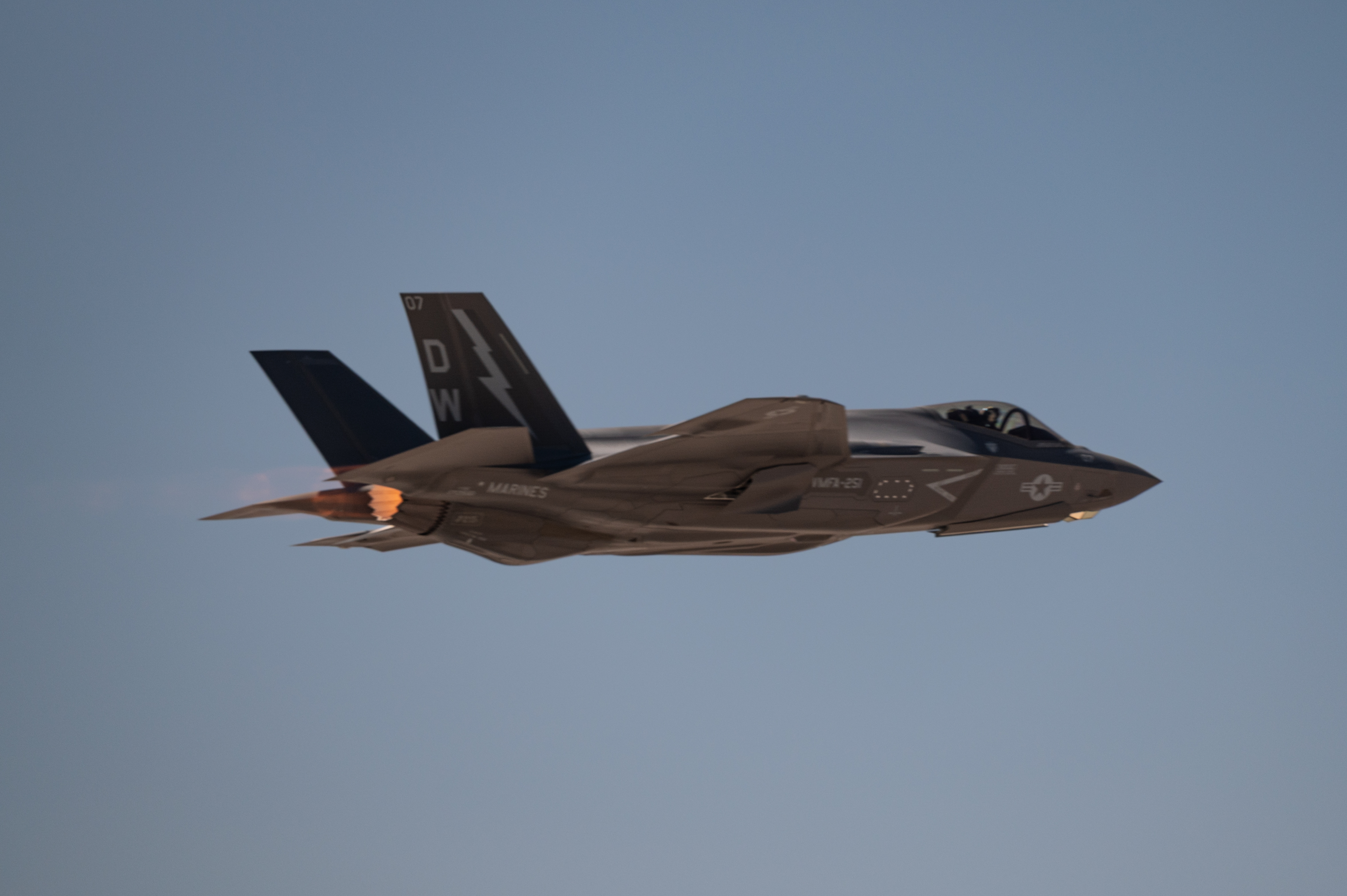
An F-35C from VMFA-251 taking off from Nellis Air Force Base for Red Flag 25-3

VMFA-251, known as the “Thunderbolts” or “T-Bolts,” deactivated during a ceremony on April 23, 2020, aboard MCAS Beaufort, South Carolina, after returning from a deployment in 2020 in support of Operation Inherent Resolve. The Thunderbolts’ deactivation concluded its 34 years as a F/A-18 Hornet squadron. The squadron was relocated to MCAS Cherry Point to begin its F-35 transition. VMFA-251 has received its first F-35C as of September 17, 2024. and was reactivated on December 5, 2024.

== Unit Awards ==
- Presidential Unit Citation Streamer with one Bronze Star
  (19 Aug 1942 – 9 Dec 1942)
  (21 Mar 2003 – 24 Apr 2004)
- Navy Unit Commendation Streamer with two Bronze Stars
  (7 Jul 1953 – 27 Jul 1953)
  (1 Oct 1997 – 30 Apr 1998)
  (11 Sep 2001 – 3 Mar 2002)
- Meritorious Unit Commendation Streamer with four Bronze Stars
  (1 Aug 1983 – 31 Mar 1986)
  (1 Aug 1987 – 1 Jul 1989)
  (25 Aug 1995 – 24 Feb 1996)
  (31 Oct 1999 – 31 Mar 2000)
  (1 Sep 2001 – 1 Aug 2004)
- Marine Corps Expeditionary Streamer
  (Cuba, Aug 1961 – Sep 1961)
- American Defense Service Streamer
  (1 Dec 1941 – 7 Dec 1941)
- American Campaign Streamer with one Bronze Star
  (7 Dec 1941 – 18 Jun 1942)
  (31 May 1943 – 29 Feb 1944)
- Asiatic/Pacific Campaign Streamer with one Silver Star and one Bronze Star
  (Capture and Defense of Guadalcanal, 19 Aug 1942 – 8 Feb 1943)
  (Consolidation of the Southern Solomons, 9 Feb 1943 – 11 May 1943)
  (Santa Crux, 26 Oct 1943)
  (Consolidation of the Northern Solomons, 18 Jun 1944 – 30 Dec 1944)
  (Luzon Operation, 3 Jan 1945 – 1 April 1945)
  (Southern Philippines, 2 April 1945 – 1 May 1945)
- World War II Victory Streamer
  (7 Dec 1941 – 1 Jun 1945)
- National Defense Service Streamer with three Bronze Stars
  (27 Jun 1950 – 27 Jul 1954)
  (1 Jan 1961 – 14 Aug 1974)
  (2 Aug 1990 – 30 Nov 1995)
  (11 Sep 2001 – TBD)
- Korean Service Streamer with one Bronze Star
  (Korea, Summer Fall 1953, 5–27 July 1953)
- Armed Forces Expeditionary Medal Streamer
  (Operation Southern Watch, 20 Feb 2003 – 18 Mar 2003)
- Southwest Asia Service Medal Streamer
  (Operation Southern Watch, Nov 1995 - Nov 1995)
- Afghanistan Campaign Medal Streamer
  (Operation Enduring Freedom, Jul 2007 - Dec 2007)
- Iraq Campaign Medal Streamer
  (Operation Iraqi Freedom, 2006 - 2006)
- Global War on Terrorism Expeditionary Medal Streamer
  (Operation Enduring Freedom, 11 Sep 2001 – Mar 2002)
- Global War on Terrorism Service Medal Streamer
  (Operation Enduring Freedom, 11 Sep 2001 – Mar 2002)
  (Operation Iraqi Freedom, 20 Mar 2003–2003)
- Philippine Presidential Unit Citation Streamer
  (2 Jan 1945 – 1 Jun 1945)
- Philippine Liberation Streamer with one Bronze Star
  (2 Jan 1945 – 2 Jun 1945)
  (2 Jan 1945 – 1 May 1945)

== See also ==
- List of active United States Marine Corps aircraft squadrons
- United States Marine Corps Aviation
- List of decommissioned United States Marine Corps aircraft squadrons
