= Naval Advance Base Espiritu Santo =

Major World War 2 base

Nickname: Espiritu Santo
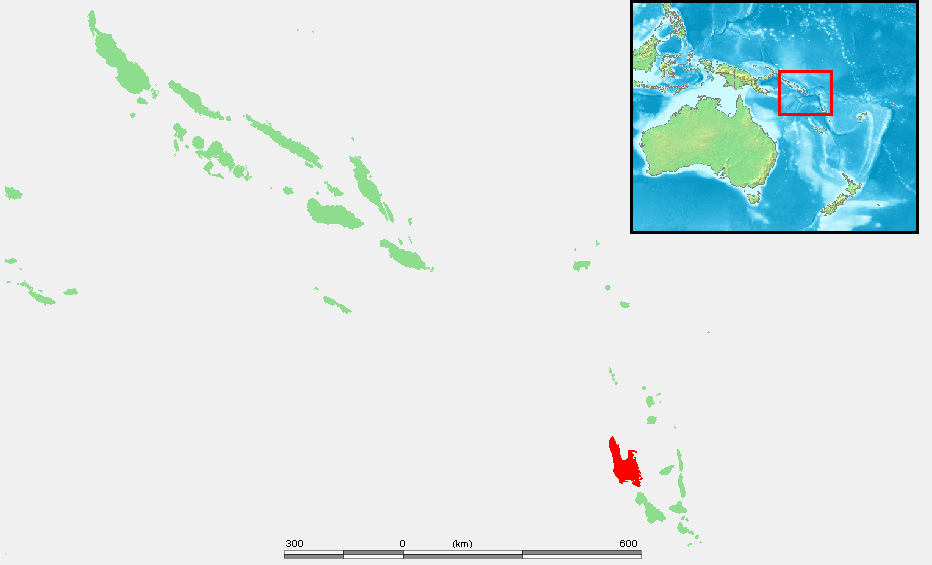
- Map of Espiritu Santo

Geography
- Location: Espiritu Santo, Vanuatu
- Coordinates: 15°30′52″S 167°10′38″E
- Archipelago: Inlands of New Hebrides
- Major islands: Espiritu Santo and Aore Island, Espiritu Santo Naval Base from 1942 to 1946

Administration
- Current name: Vanuatu, US Navy New Hebrides in 1940s
- Largest settlement: City of Luganville

Naval Advance Base Espiritu Santo or Naval Base Espiritu Santo, most often just called Espiritu Santo, was a major advance Naval base that the U.S. Navy Seabees built during World War II to support the Allied effort in the Pacific. The base was located on the island of Espiritu Santo in the New Hebrides, now Vanuatu, in the South Pacific. The base also supported the U.S. Army and Army Air Corps, U.S. Coast Guard, and US Marine Corps. It was the first large advance base built in the Pacific. By the end of the war it had become the second-largest base in the theater. To keep ships tactically available there was a demand for bases that could repair and resupply the fleet at advance locations, rather than return them to the United States. Prior to December 7th, Pearl Harbor was the U.S. fleet's largest advance base in the Pacific. Espiritu became capable of all aspects necessary to support the Fleet's operations from fleet logistics in fuel, food, and ammunition, to transport embarkation for combat operations or returning to the continental United States. The ship repair facilities and drydocks were capable of attending to most damage and routine maintenance. Had it not existed, ships would have had to return to Pearl Harbor, Brisbane, or Sydney for major repairs and resupply. The base became a major R and R destination for the fleet.

== History ==
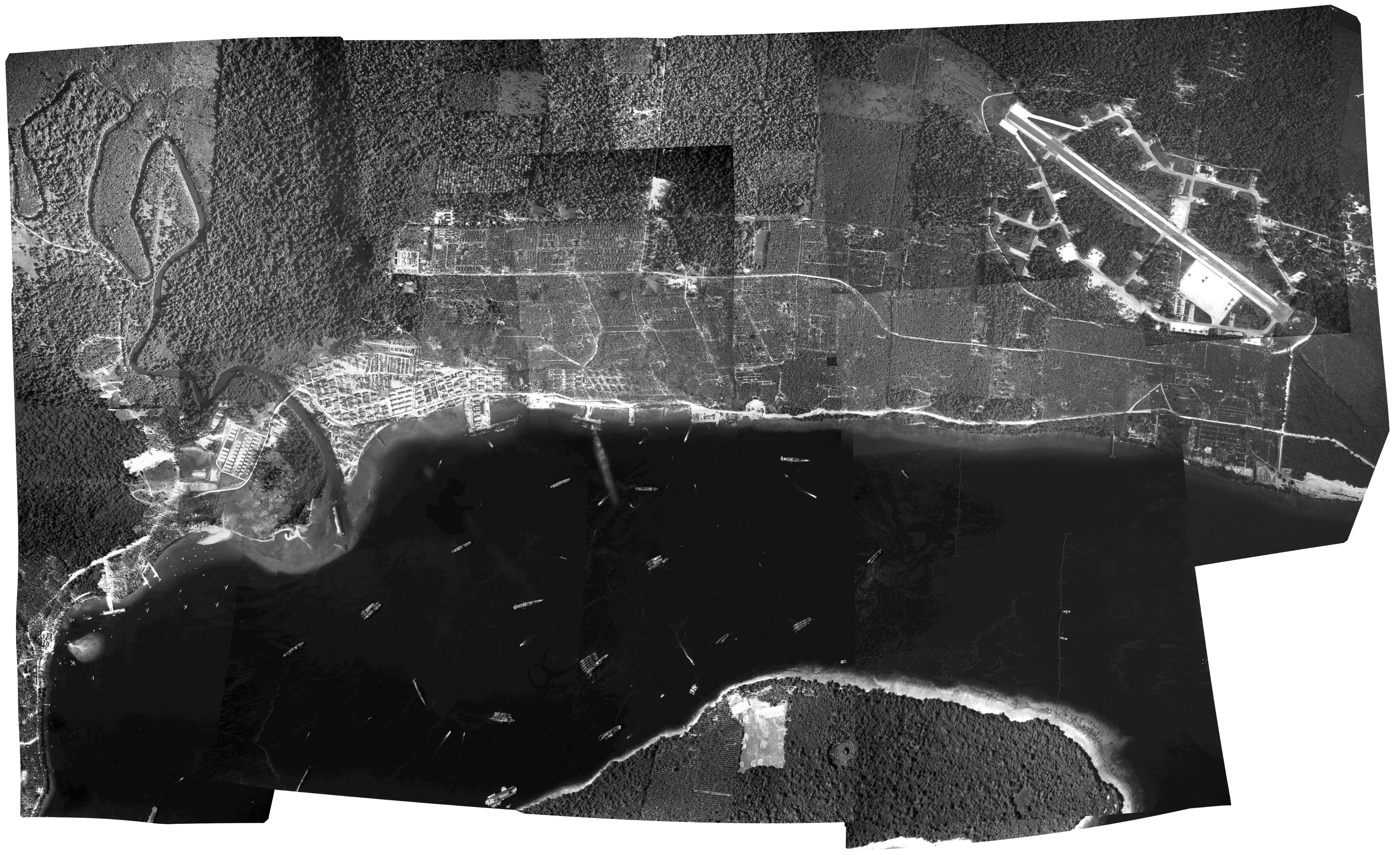
Espiritu Santo Naval Base and to the right Bomber Field # 2

At the start of the war Espiritu Santo was one of a string of roughly 80 islands under the rule of a joint British and French New Hebrides colony. The administration was the Anglo-French Condominium of the New Hebrides. U.S. troops first set up a base in May 1942 on the nearby island of Efate, as a defense against the expanding Imperial Japan. In July 1942 the 1st Construction Battalion (CB) sent a detail from the 3rd CB Construction detachment that was on Efate to Espiritu Santo to build a bomber strip to attack the Japanese on Guadalcanal. The 4th Marine Defense Battalion and the 24th Infantry Regiment both on Efate respectively sent an anti-aircraft battery and an Infantry Company to help the Seabees. Together, working around the clock, they built Turtle Bay Airfield in 20 days. In August, 7th CB arrived tasked with constructing a base. In 60 days they had built a second field and began work on two more. In October, the 15th CB arrived, followed by the 35th CB on January 27, 1943. In February, the 36th Naval Construction Battalion arrived as did the 40th CB.

== Facilities ==
- Navy port - support base
- Navy Base Hospital No. 1 at Bellevue plantation, 1,500-beds in quonset huts (600 beds to start)
- Navy Base Hospital No. 2
- Navy Base Hospital No. 3, now Northern Provincial Hospital
- 25th Evacuation Hospital
- Naval harbors for anchoring
- Floating drydock repairs
- Luganville Seaplane Base served the PBY seaplanes at Havannah Harbor
- Pontoon wharf at Santo
- Vanuatu Labor Corps
- Naval Air Station Tender
- Crash boat base
- Aviation Overhaul shop
- Red Cross Service Club
- Officers Club
- Casual camp
- Motor pool
- Quartermaster Laundry
- 17th Photo Detachment
- Army Air Force Transient Camp
- Army Air Force Fighter pilot camp
- Royal New Zealand Air Force Fighter pilot camp
- Firing ranges
- Torpedo assembly center
- Construction Battalion Maintenance Unit
- Navy Fleet Ammunition Stores, large complex north of base for safety
- Marine Air Depot Squadron
- Army Air Force Bombers Camp
- Marine Camp
- Marine Air Warning Squadron
- Oxygen Plant
- Navy Net Layer center
- US Navy Port Director's Office, now Cruise Ship Terminal
- Navy Pier No 1, now Cruise Ship Terminal
- Navy Pier No 2, 3 and 4
- Aore Island - Navy Ammunition store, Navy mine assembly, Fuel Store, Fleet Recreational Center
- PT Boat base #1 and #2
- Sarakata River Bridge
- Boat repair dock
- Pallikula Bay Pontoon Wharf
- AA gun emplacements
- Naval Air Transport Service Facilities
- Tank farms for: Fuel oil, aviation fuel, diesel fuel, gasoline
- Headquarters at Malapoa Point
- Barracks
- Navy Bank
- Fleet Post Office FPO# 140 SF Espiritu Santo, New Hebrides
- Mess halls
- Navy Communication Center
- Troop store
- Royal New Zealand Air Force seaplane base
- Military supply depot
- Espiritu Santo Military Cemetery opened in 1944
- Army 122nd Station Hospital
- 687th Quartermaster Bakery Company
- US Army Radar & Searchlight
- 674th Signal Air Warning Company
- Coral mining pits
- Trash dump

Built at the bases were personnel housing, piers, roads, shops, power plants, water plants and large storage depots with fuel, ammunition, food and other consumable supplies. Fuel for ships, planes and vehicles was in much demand. The build up of Espiritu Santo was both a defense strategy and then a staging point for the offense against the Japanese. The base supported action in the Solomon Islands and Papua New Guinea. The base was very active in the Solomon Islands campaign and New Guinea campaign. There were always fears that New Hebrides and Espiritu Santo would be invaded. To build all the bases and airfield tens of thousands of tonnes of equipment was shipped to the base. By the end of the war 9 million tonnes of equipment had been shipped there and over 500,000 servicemen and women had spent some time at New Hebrides and Espiritu Santo.

== Airfields ==
US Navy seabees built four airfields near the naval base, three to support United States Army Air Forces bombers, one to support fighter aircraft. The Royal New Zealand Air Force and US Marine Corps also operated from the airfields.

- Palikulo Bay Airfield also called Bomber Field #1
- Pekoa Airfield also called Bomber Field #2, which became the international airport after the war
- Luganville Airfield also called Bomber Field #3
- Turtle Bay Airfield also called Fighter Field #1

The base also supported the US New Caledonia base, 300 miles (480 km) to the southwest and the Fiji training base, 600 miles (970 km) to the east. Crushed coral was used for the runways, ramps and road. Local coconut logs were used in building the base.

== Auxiliary floating drydock ==
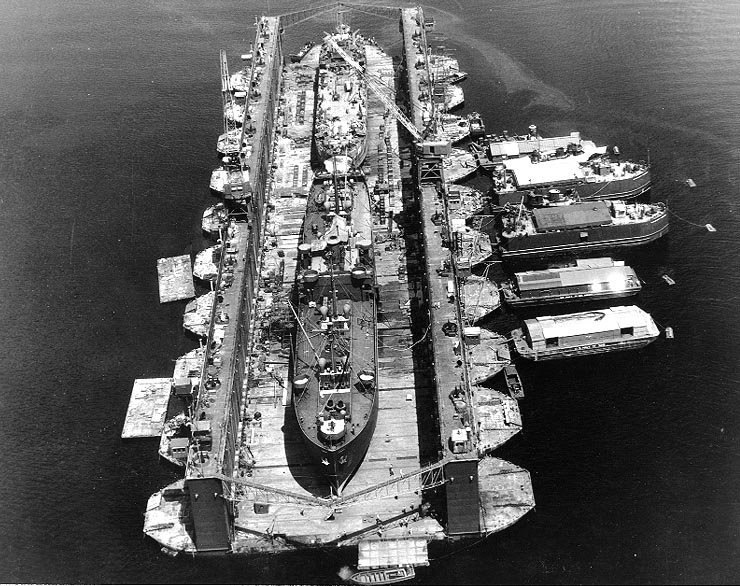
Artisan with USS Antelope (IX-109) and LST-120 in the dock at Espiritu Santo in January 1945

Auxiliary floating drydocks were used to repair ships. Three large floating drydocks were stationed at the base. Advance base sectional dock (ABSD) were able to repair the largest of the Navy's ships.

- USS Artisan (ABSD-1) (A-J), built by Everett-Pacific and others, docked in the Segond Channel, off Aese island. This was the largest floating drydock ever built able to lift 90,000 tons out of the water for repairs.
- USS AFD-14 served Espiritu Santo. This was a Small Auxiliary Floating Dry Dock. AFD were built as one piece, open at both ends. AFD were used to repair small craft, PT boats and small submarines.
- (USS AFDB-2 (A-J), built by Mare Island Naval Shipyard in Vallejo, California. Assembled at the base and then towed to Admiralty Islands's Seeadler Harbor.)
- (USS AFDB-4 (A-G), built by Mare Island Naval Ship Yard (NSY). Assembled at the base and then towed to Admiralty Islands's Seeadler Harbor. Attacked by air on April 27, 1945. Partially sunk 1989 as a reef.)

== SS President Coolidge ==
SS President Coolidge sank at Espiritu Santo. Coolidge was built as luxury ocean liner in 1931. In 1941 the US War Department converted the ship to a troopship with a capacity of 5,000. On 26 October 1942 it was sunk by two U.S. Navy mines when it unknowingly entered a mined area. It was run aground to keep from sinking while the crew and 5,340 troops safely disembarked. Two died from the mine explosions: a fireman in the engine room and a captain of the 103rd Field Artillery Regiment who had returned to the ship when he heard men were still trapped in the infirmary. As the ship went down it slipped off the reef and sank in the channel. The President Coolidge is the largest and most accessible wreck dive in the world. The ship has vast array of corals and fish, including barracuda and sharks. The President Coolidge is part of the tentative list of World Heritage Site listing.

== Million Dollar Point ==
At the end of the war a vast amount of vehicles, supplies and equipment at the bases was deemed not needed and too costly to ship to the U.S. Also it would have hurt home front industries in bringing all the gear home as there was already a vast amount of military surplus. The U.S. attempted to sell much of the gear to the French for 6 cents on the dollar. The French hoped that by buying none of the gear the U.S would abandon the base and they would get everything for free. But the U.S had the Seabees build a ramp into the sea near Luganville Airfield. The gear was then dumped into the sea. The base was abandoned in February 1946. Today the site is a tourist attraction called Million Dollar Point.

== Post war ==
In 1948 author, James Michener wrote a sequence of fictional short stories called Tales of the South Pacific. The stories became the basis for the Rodgers and Hammerstein musical, South Pacific. As many troops stayed at or passed through the base, the island became a tourist spot, including a popular scuba diving spot. The Navy base is now part of the city of Luganville.

== South Pacific World War II Museum ==
There is a plan to build a South Pacific World War II Museum on Espiritu Santo in the town of Luganville. The site will be at Unity Park, Main Street, Luganville, Vanuatu. On 26 October 2017 the South Pacific World War II's Museum Museum Project Development Office opened. A few quonset huts and other remnants can still be found on the island.

== See also ==
- Tales of the South Pacific
- Roi Mata
- Seabees in World War II
- Battle of the Eastern Solomons
- US Naval Advance Bases
