= Santo International Airport =

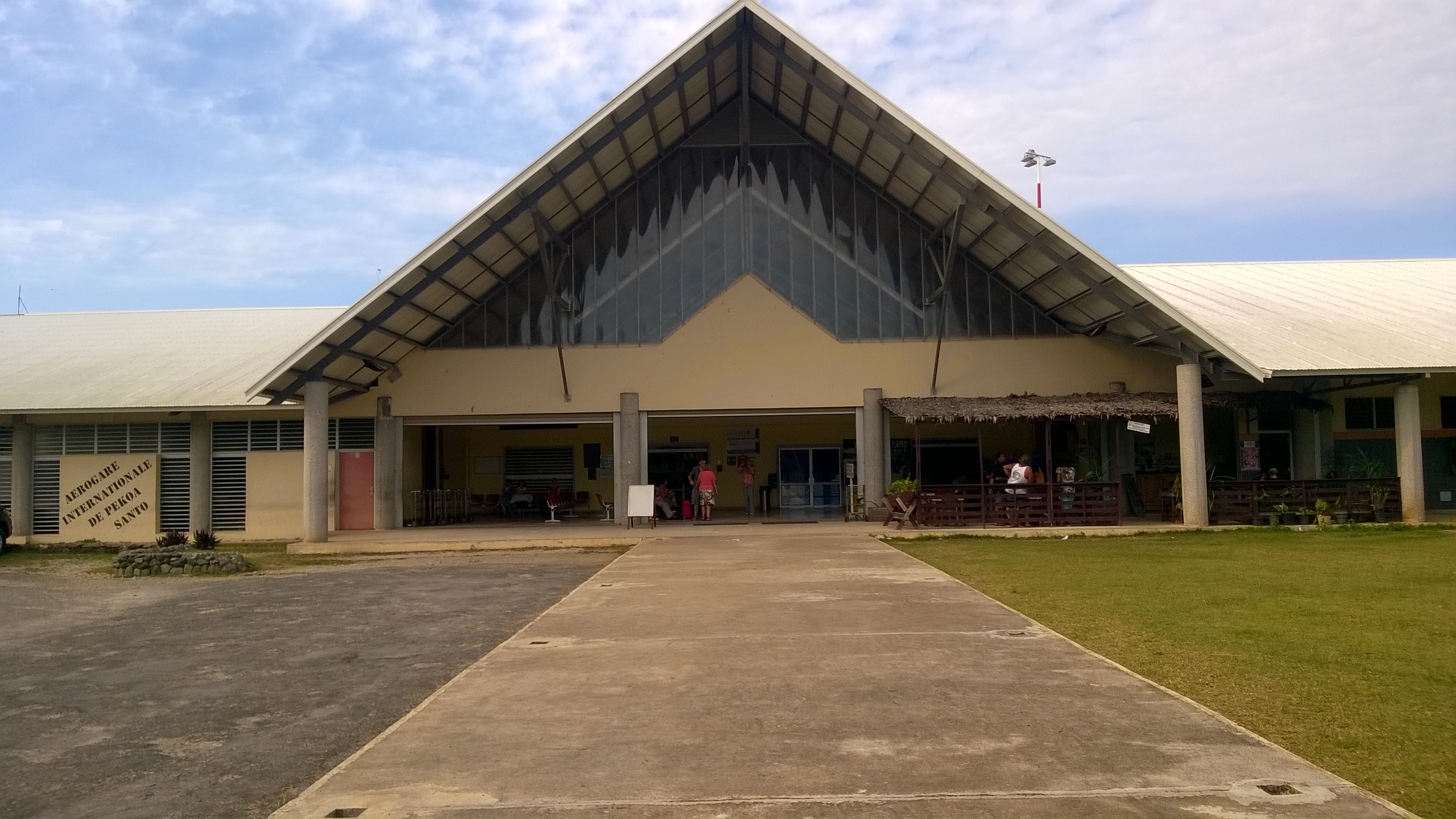
- IATA: SON; ICAO: NVSS

Summary
- Operator: Airports Vanuatu Limited
- Location: Luganville, Vanuatu
- Elevation AMSL: 184 ft (56 m)
- Coordinates: 15°30′21″S 167°13′17″E

Map
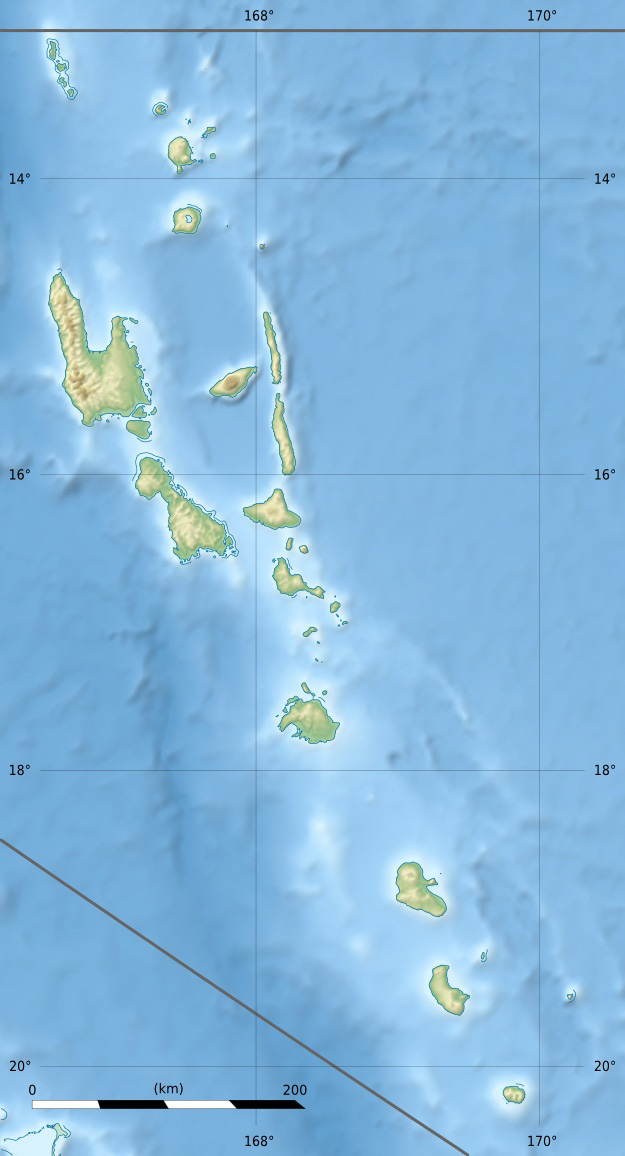
- Location of airport in Vanuatu

Runways
Direction	Length		Surface
Direction	ft	m	Surface
12/30	6,523	1,988	Asphalt
- Sources: World Aero Data, Great Circle Mapper

Pekoa Airfield
- Espiritu Santo, New Hebrides Islands

Site information
- Type: Military airfield
- Controlled by: United States Army Air Forces; United States Navy
- Condition: abandoned

Location
- Coordinates: 15°30′18.12″S 167°13′11.07″E

Site history
- Built: 1942
- Built by: Seebees
- In use: 1942-5
- Materials: Coral

Santo International Airport is an airport in Luganville on Espiritu Santo in Vanuatu (IATA: SON, ICAO: NVSS). The airport used to be called Santo-Pekoa International Airport until it was renamed in the Vanuatu AIPV amendment released on 16 June 2021. Airports Vanuatu Limited provides aviation services for the airport.

== Airlines and destinations ==
Airlines	Destinations
Air Vanuatu	Gaua, Longana, Lonorore, Maewo, Mota Lava, Norsup, Port Vila, Sara, Sola, Walaha
Solomon Airlines	Brisbane, Honiara, Port Vila

== History ==
=== World War II ===
The 7th Naval Construction Battalion arrived on Santo on 11 August 1942 to begin construction of more extensive Espiritu Santo Naval Base air facilities to support the Guadalcanal Campaign. After completing a second fighter airfield at Turtle Bay they began constructing two bomber fields, one at Palikulo Bay known as Bomber Field No. 1 and the other at Pekoa, known as Bomber Field No. 2. Working in cooperation with a company of the US Army 810th Engineer Aviation Battalion, the 7th CB cleared, graded, and surfaced a 5,000 feet (1,500 m) by 150 feet (46 m) coral runway on the site of a prewar plantation. The 15th CB arrived on Santo on 13 October 1942 and extended the runway to 7,000 feet (2,100 m) with pierced steel planking over a coral base, and built taxiways, revetments, and miscellaneous structures. The completed airfield was operational in December 1942 and was known as "Bomber Field No. 2" or "Pekoa Field".

The Thirteenth Air Force was based at Pekoa from 13 January 1943 until 20 January 1944 when it moved to Carney Airfield on Guadalcanal. Units assigned were:

- Headquarters, XIII Bomber Command, 13 January-20 August 1943
- Headquarters, XIII Fighter Command, 22 January–December 1943
- 5th Bombardment Group, 1 December 1942 – 19 August 1943
- 11th Bombardment Group, 22 July 1942 – 8 April 1943
- 18th Fighter Group, 11 March-17 April 1943
- 4th Reconnaissance Group, 23 January 1943 – 6 May 1944
- 403d Troop Carrier Group, 13 September 1943 – 30 August 1944

As the war moved further north, Pekoa Airfield was closed on 8 February 1945 and all traffic routed to Palikulo Bay Airfield.

=== Postwar ===
Luganville Airfield was used as a civilian airstrip until the early 1970s, however as it was on higher ground it was often clouded in and so it was decided to move all operations to the former Pekoa Airfield/Bomber Field No.2 which became Santo-Pekoa International Airport.

Of the four wartime airfields on Espiritu Santo: Turtle Bay Airfield, Palikulo Bay Airfield, Luganville Airfield and Pekoa; Pekoa is the only wartime airfield still in use.

== See also ==
- Luganville Seaplane Base
- USAAF in the South Pacific
