= Luganville Seaplane Base =

- Espiritu Santo, New Hebrides Islands
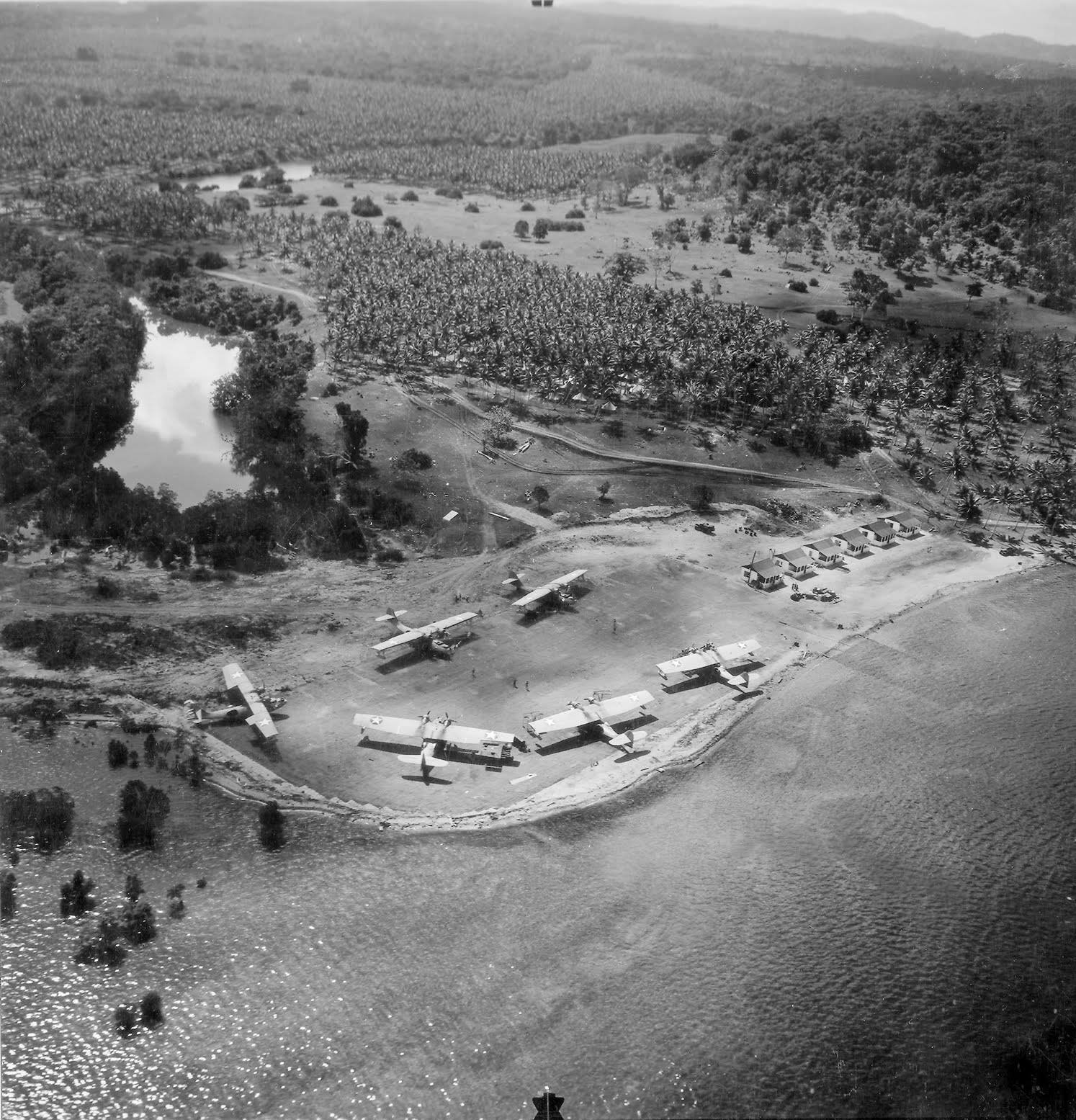
- PBY Catalinas at the Luganville Seaplane Base Ramp in February 1942

Site information
- Type: Military Seaplane Base
- Controlled by: United States Navy
- Condition: abandoned

Location
- Coordinates: 15°33′18″S 167°08′49.2″E

Site history
- Built: 1942
- Built by: Seebees
- In use: 1942-5

Luganville Seaplane Base is a former World War II seaplane base in the Segond Channel between the islands of Espiritu Santo and Aore Island in the New Hebrides Islands at the Espiritu Santo Naval Base.

== History ==
=== World War II ===
The first bases on Espiritu Santo were established by the United States as defensive bases to guard the existing facility at Efate and to support the Solomon Islands Campaign, however its strategic location led to its expansion into one of the largest advance bases in the South Pacific. The 7th Naval Construction Battalion arrived on Santo on 11 August 1942 and began construction of more extensive air facilities to support the Guadalcanal Campaign. The 7th Battalion constructed a parking area, two pre-fabricated 85 feet (26 m) by 100 feet (30 m) nose hangars, warehouses, quonset huts and two seaplane ramps at Belchif Point on the Segond Channel between the Renee and Sarakata Rivers. The 57th Naval Construction Battalion later built two seaplane drydocks at the base.

United States Navy units based at the base included:

- VP-11 11 August 1942 – 1 February 1943
- VP-12 14 June-30 July 1944
- VP-14 1 September-10 December 1943
- VP-23 15 July-1 October 1942 and 24 June-20 August 1943
- VP-24 1 February-29 September 1943
- VP-54 1 August-10 November 1944
- VP-72 4 September 1942 - 6 July 1943
- VP-91 4 September 1942 - March 1943

all operating PBYs.

US Navy ships supporting seaplane operations included:

- USS Curtiss 11 August 1942 – 9 July 1943.
- USS Mackinac August–November 1942
- USS Tangier 28 February-12 August 1943
- USS Wright October 1945

Royal New Zealand Air Force units operating from the base included:

- No. 5 Squadron operating PBYs from 10 November 1944
- No. 6 Squadron operating PBYs from November 1943

=== Postwar ===
NOB Espiritu Santo disestablished on 12 June 1946. The base's onshore facilities are now overgrown and are under private ownership. Erosion caused by Cyclone Harold in April 2020 revealed details of the layout of the base, including exposing one of the seaplane ramps.

== See also ==
- Luganville Airfield
- Palikulo Bay Airfield
- Santo-Pekoa International Airport
- Turtle Bay Airfield
