= South Pacific WWII Museum =

World War II museum in Vanuatu

Coordinates: 15°30′56″S 167°10′23″E

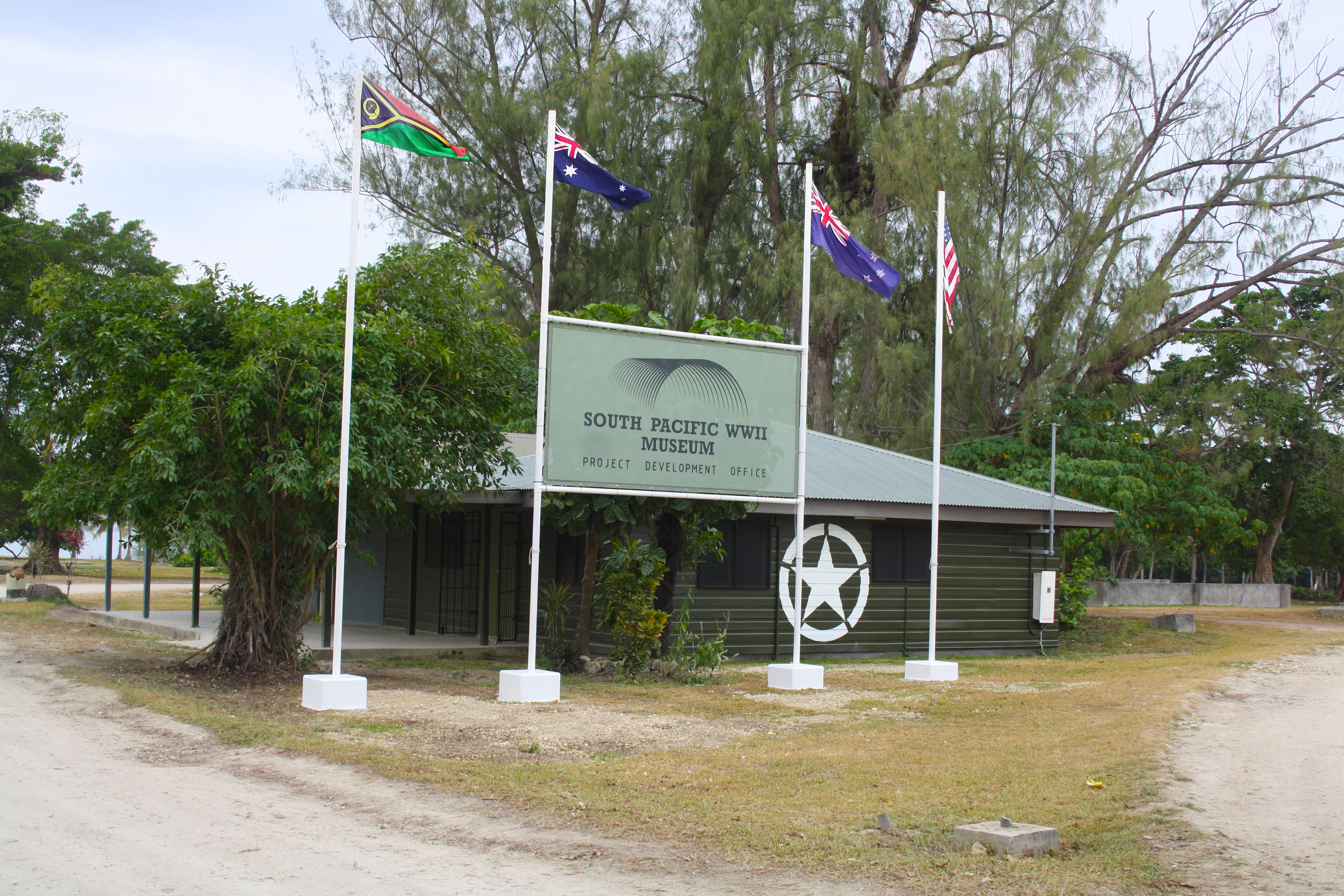
The current South Pacific WWII Museum's 'mini museum' in Unity Park, Luganville.

The South Pacific WWII Museum is a military history museum located on the South Pacific island of Espiritu Santo in Vanuatu. The museum is dedicated to preserving and showcasing the history of World War II in the South Pacific region. It serves as an educational and commemorative destination, highlighting the island's role in the Pacific Theatre and rediscovering the lost history of the region.

== History ==
The South Pacific WWII Museum project was initiated in 2012 after the Town Clerk of Luganville, Peter Sakita and local business identity Bradley Wood met to discuss a way to put Luganville on the map. Bradley proposed the idea of building a museum, specifically a World War II educational museum, to commemorate the island's contributions during the Pacific War of World War II.

With the support of the local government, the Elwood J Euart Association — a group of business leaders in Luganville — was formed to spearhead the effort.

A site was chosen for the museum on the banks of the Sarakata River. The area was the former home of U.S. Navy’s Motor Torpedo Squadron 2 on the edge of Luganville's Unity Park.

In 2016, the Vanuatu Government represented by Minister for Lands Ralph Regenvanu and the Association, signed a long term 'peppercorn lease' on the former US Navy PT Boat base site.

== Mini-museum and exhibits ==
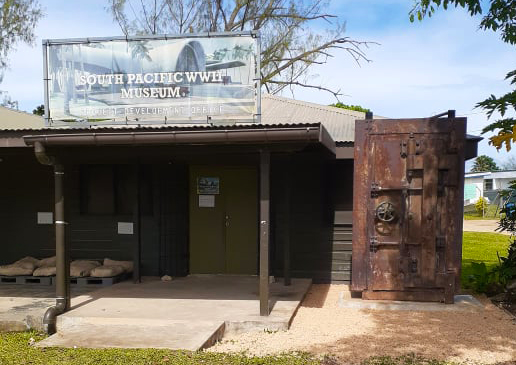
Museum entrance and US Navy bank vault door

A temporary mini-museum was opened in 2017. The smaller premises serves as a museum and headquarters for the project to build a bigger museum on the site of the old WWII PT Boat base. The museum features a wide range of exhibits that provide a comprehensive overview of the South Pacific's involvement in World War II, including the military campaigns, the experiences of soldiers, and the impact of the war in the region.

Working with WWII historian and author Donna Esposito, the Museum is also involved with researching WWII army, navy and marine corps dog tags found on Espiritu Santo and reuniting them with surviving family members, predominantly in the USA.

=== Artefacts and memorabilia ===
The South Pacific WWII Museum features a large collection of authentic artefacts and memorabilia from the Pacific War, including weapons, equipment, letters, photographs, and personal belongings of soldiers who served in the South Pacific. Many of the artefacts on display were found locally on Espiritu Santo, contributing greatly to the wartime storytelling history of the island. Others, such as the large US Navy bank vault door at the entrance to the museum and the remains of a P-38 Lightning aircraft, have been donated by locals on the island.

=== Major displays ===
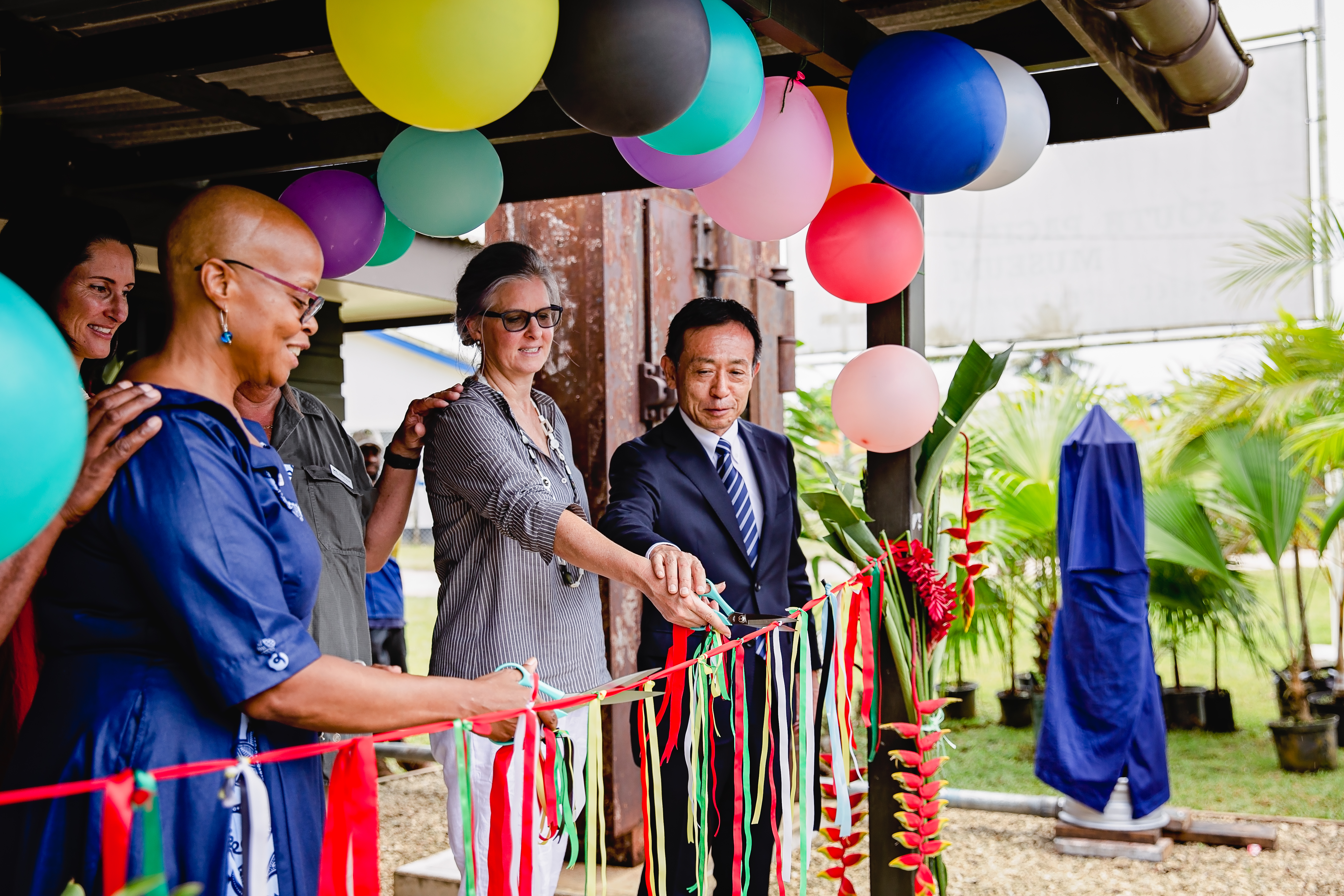
The opening of the SS President Coolidge Exhibition at the South Pacific WWII Museum. From left to right Nicola Simmonds, New Zealand High Commissioner to Vanuatu; Penny Alexander, United States Peace Corps Director for Vanuatu; Heidi Bootle, Australian High Commissioner to Vanuatu; and Chiba Hirohisa, Japanese Ambassador to Vanuatu.

The museum curates special exhibitions such as the 2022/23 SS President Coolidge Exhibition. The exhibition launched on October 27, 2022 on what was the 80th anniversary of the sinking of the troop carrying passenger liner on the shores of Espiritu Santo. The commemoration and exhibition opening was attended by dignitaries including the Australian High Commissioner to Vanuatu, the New Zealand High Commissioner to Vanuatu, the Ambassador of Japan to Vanuatu and other invited dignitaries.

The exhibition features many items recovered from the sea floor around the sunken ship in 1970s, by diver Allan Power. He was inducted into the International Scuba Diving Hall of Fame in 2011, in part, for the work he had done helping to preserve the Coolidge wreck. Power died in January 2019.

== Future plans ==
The South Pacific WWII Museum plans to proceed with a staged approach for the museum's development. While the original design was based on the Quonset hut, a characteristic structure of the World War II era, the museum's first stage will consist of a main display gallery inside a Quonset hut-inspired building. This initial stage will showcase life on Santo during WWII and feature a smaller open-sided Quonset hut housing a significant museum piece, a WWII landing craft known as a Higgins Boat.

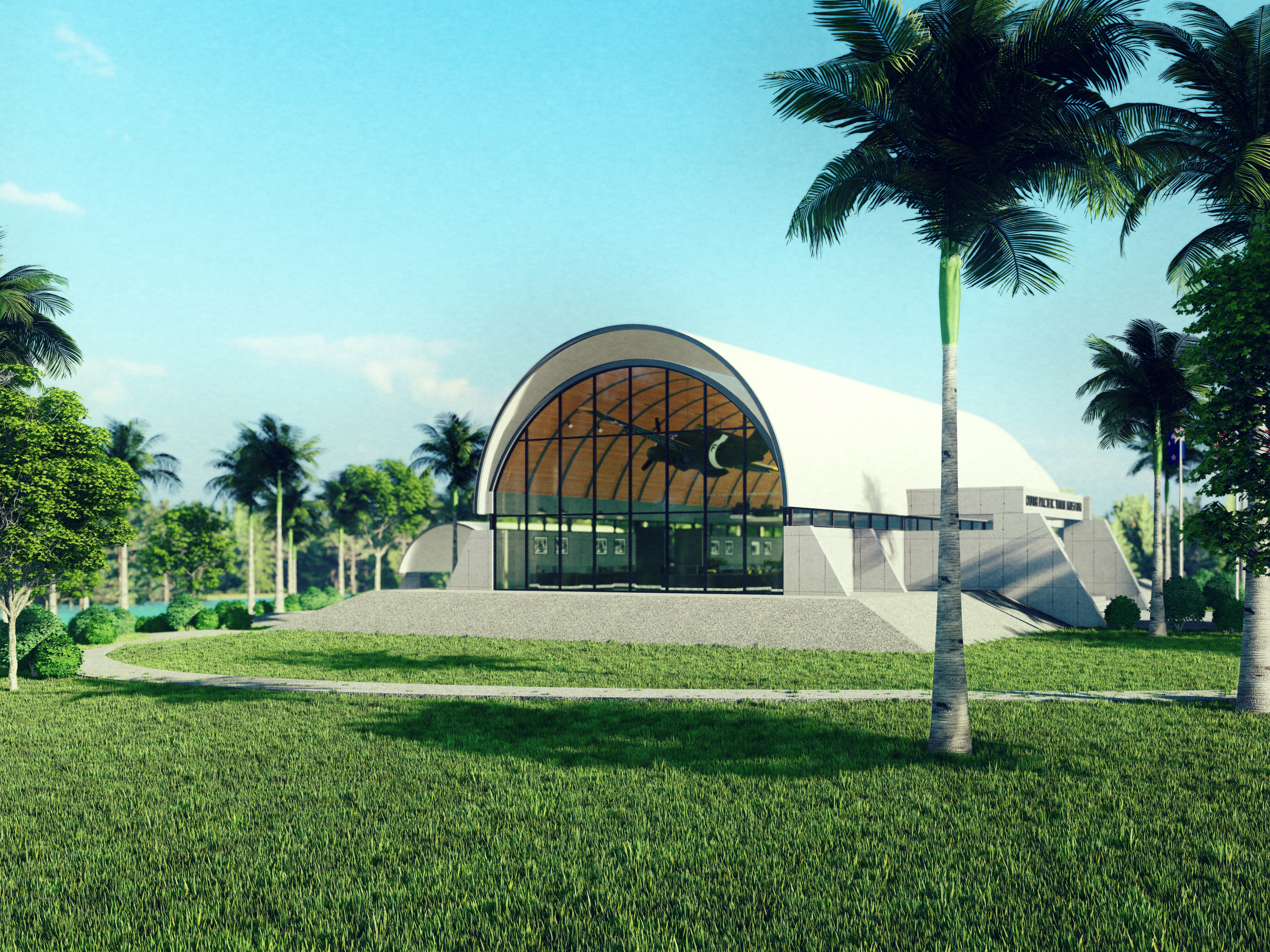
An exterior rendering of the proposed Stage 1 of the South Pacific WWII Museum.

The main structure of the museum will house staff offices, a meeting room, a small theatrette, and restrooms. A mezzanine floor will provide an elevated view of the main gallery. The museum's glass southern end will offer a view of Unity Park, the mouth of the Sarakata River, and the Segond Channel.

The South Pacific WWII Museum aims to engage the local Ni-Vanuatu community, and also serve as a commemorative space to honour those who supported the war effort in the South Pacific.

== See also ==
- Military museums
