= Walaha Airport =

Airport in Vanuatu

- IATA: WLH; ICAO: NVSW

Summary
- Airport type: Public
- Serves: Walaha, Ambae Island, Vanuatu
- Elevation AMSL: 151 ft (46 m)
- Coordinates: 15°25′S 167°41′E

Map
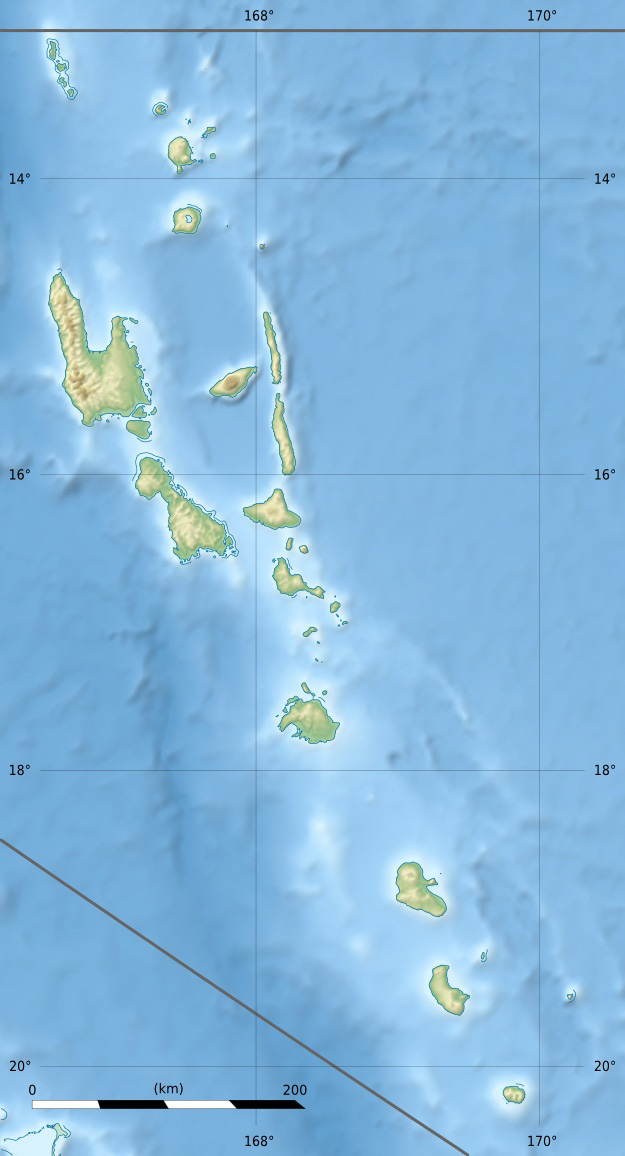
- Location of airport in Vanuatu

Runways
Direction	Length		Surface
Direction	m	ft	Surface
	660	2,165

Walaha Airport is an airport in Walaha, Vanuatu (IATA: WLH, ICAO: NVSW).

== Airlines and destinations ==
Air Vanuatu connects Walaha Airport to Santo-Pekoa International Airport (Luganville) and Port Vila International Airport.
