= Turtle Bay Airfield =

- Espiritu Santo, New Hebrides Islands
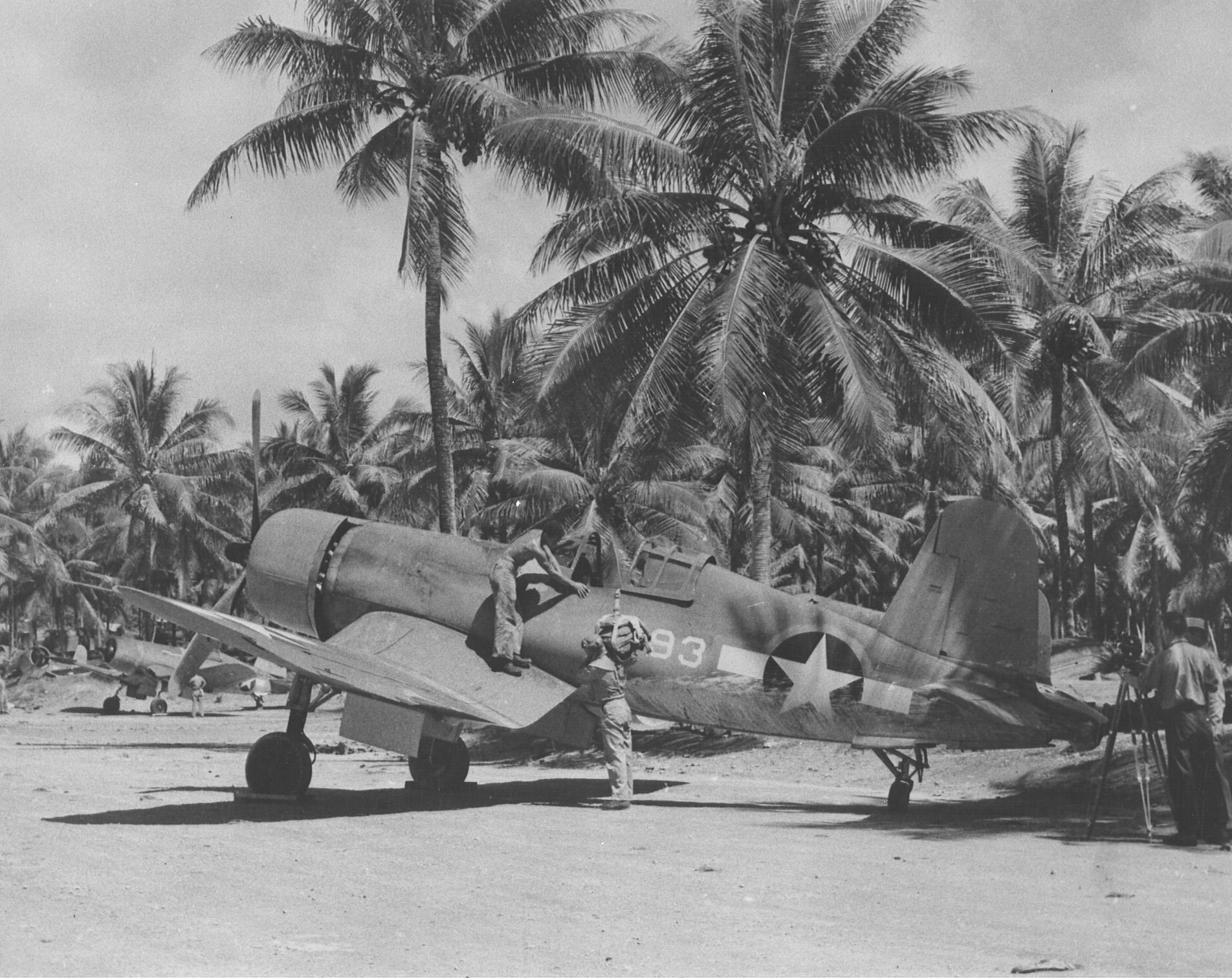
- An F4U of VMF-214 at Turtle Bay Airfield in November 1943

Site information
- Type: Military Airfield
- Controlled by: United States Army Air Forces; United States Navy
- Condition: abandoned

Location
- Coordinates: 15°22′41″S 167°10′45″E

Site history
- Built: 1942
- Built by: 3rd Naval Construction Detachment, 1st Naval Construction Battalion
- In use: 1942-5
- Materials: Coral

Turtle Bay Airfield or Fighter Field #1 is a former World War II airfield on the island of Espiritu Santo in the New Hebrides Islands at the Espiritu Santo Naval Base.

== History ==
=== World War II ===
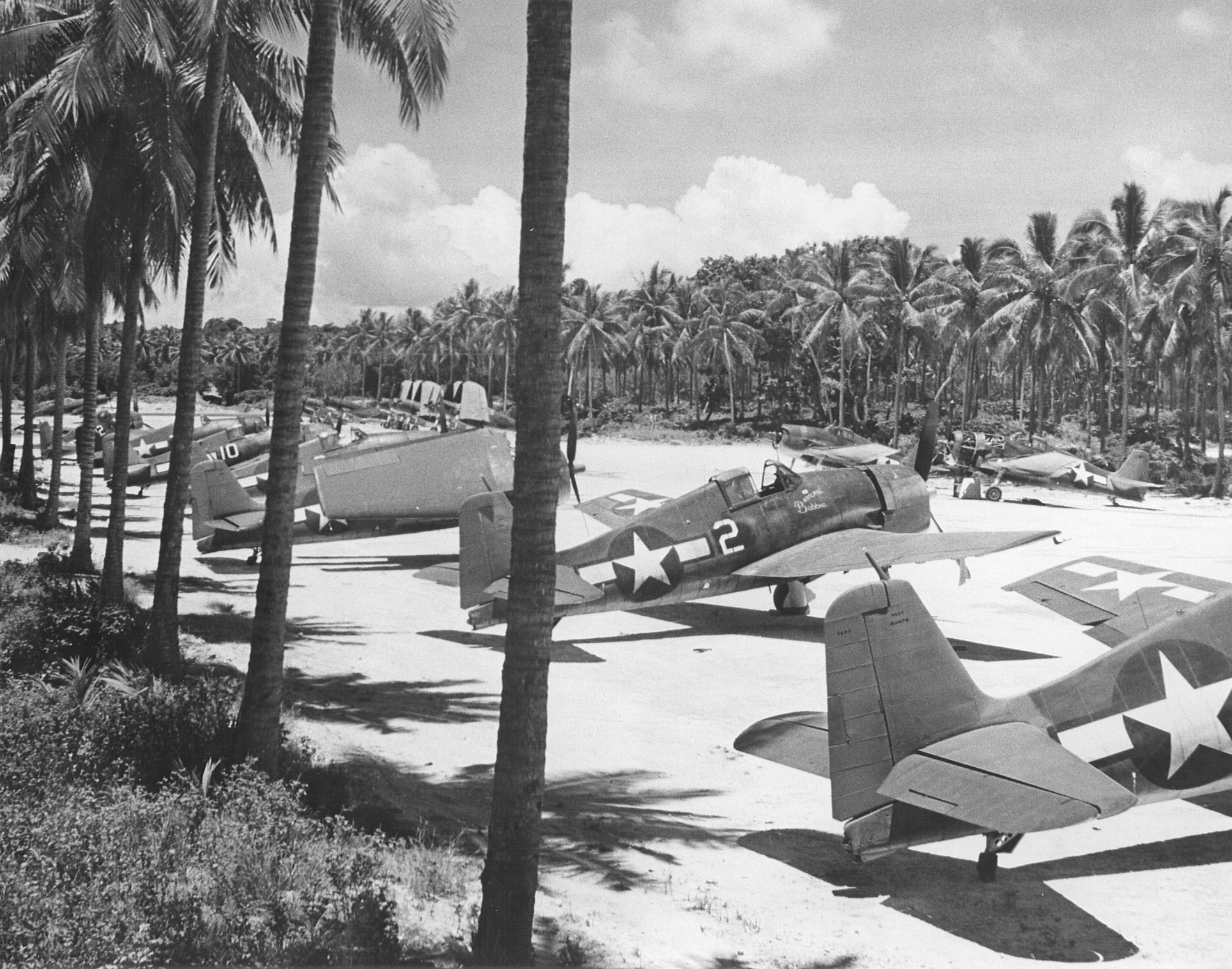
F6F-3 Hellcats of VF-40 at Turtle Bay

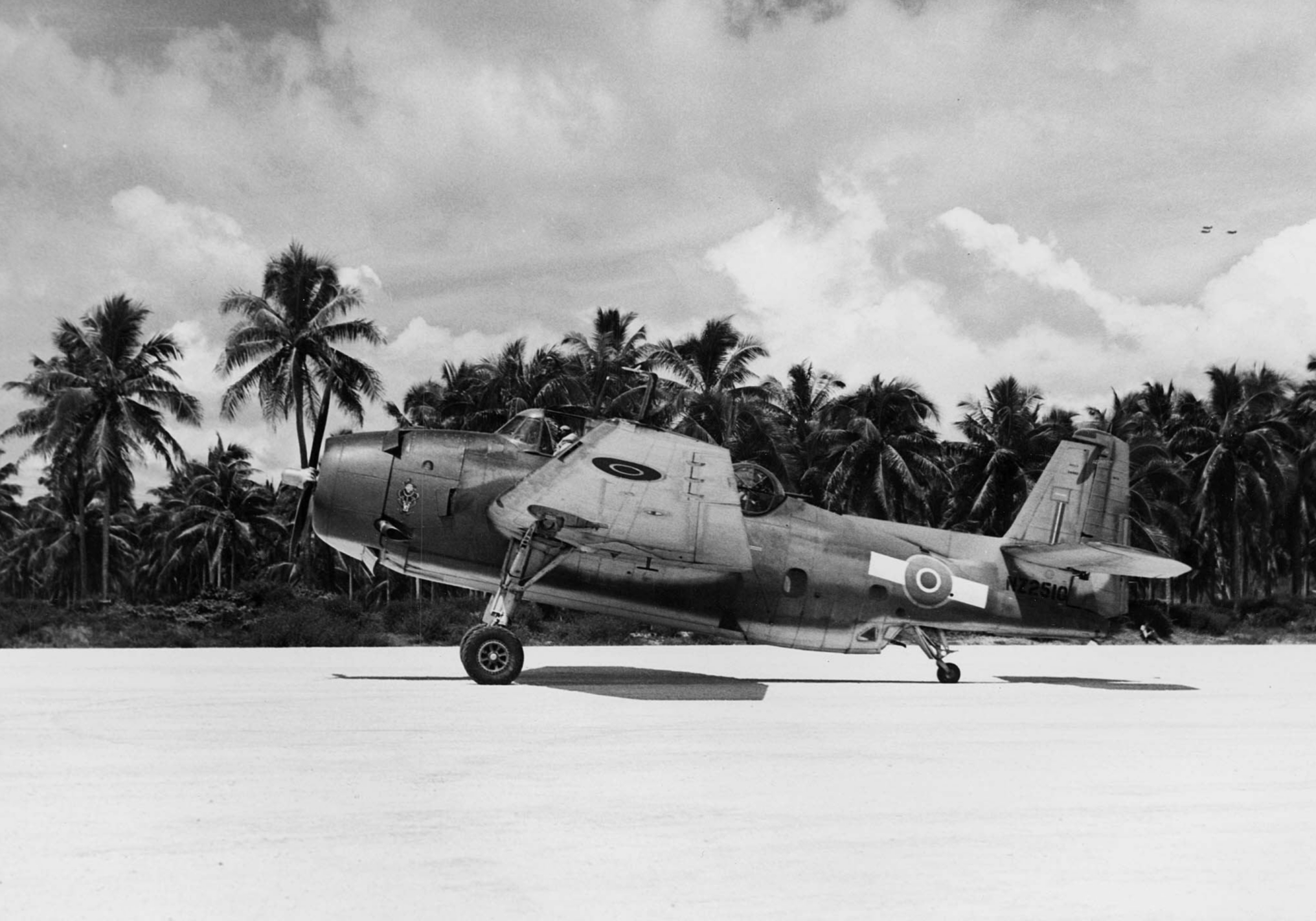
A TBF-1C of No. 30 Squadron RNZAF at Turtle Bay, February 1944

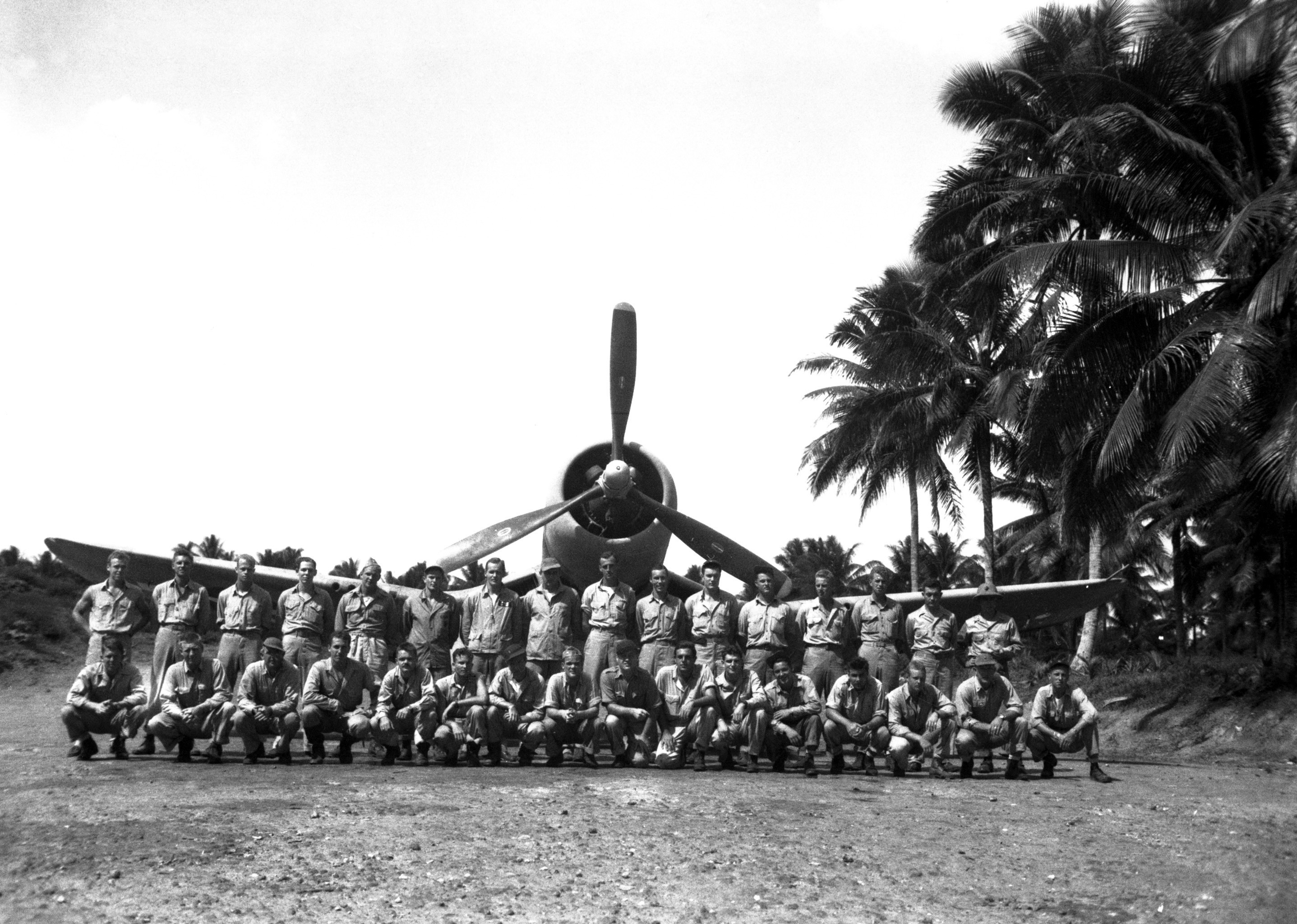
VMF-214 at Turtle Bay in September 1943

The first bases on Espiritu Santo were established by the U.S. Navy as defensive bases to guard the existing facility at Efate and to support the Solomon Islands Campaign, however its strategic location led to its expansion into one of the largest advance bases in the South Pacific. A group of Seebees from the 3rd Construction Battalion detachment (1st Naval Construction Battalion) with an anti-aircraft battery from the 4th Defense Battalion and a company of colored infantrymen arrived on Santo on 8 July 1942 to begin work on Turtle Bay airfield to bomb the airfield the Japanese were building on Guadalcanal. The Seabees were given twenty days in which to construct the airfield, assisted by 295 infantrymen, 90 Marines and 50 natives. Working around the clock, a 6,000 feet (1,800 m) runway was cleared and surfaced with coral within the time given. On 28 July the first fighter squadron came in and was followed the next day by B-17s of the 26th Bombardment Squadron. The planes were fueled from drums and carried out their first attack on Japanese forces on Guadalcanal on 30 July.

USAAF units based at Turtle Bay included:

- 26th Bombardment Squadron with B-17s July–August 1942.

US Navy and USMC units based at Turtle Bay included:

- Marine Aircraft Group 11 (MAG-11)
  - VMO-251 with F4Fs August–November 1942
  - VS-3 with SBDs September–November 1942
  - VMF-213 with F4Us 8 June 1943
  - VMF-214 with F4Us 7 December 1943
  - VMF-115 with F4Us 13 June 1944
  - VMF-121 with F4Us
- MAG-14
  - VMF-212
- MAG-33

On 26 October 1944 PBJ-1D #35152 of VMB-611 crash-landed at Turtle Bay, the plane was written off

=== Postwar ===
Fighter One was disestablished on 2 January 1945. NOB Espiritu Santo disestablished on 12 June 1946. The airfield is largely overgrown with vegetation.

== See also ==
- Luganville Airfield
- Luganville Seaplane Base
- Palikulo Bay Airfield
- Santo-Pekoa International Airport
