= Palikulo Bay Airfield =

- Espiritu Santo, New Hebrides Islands
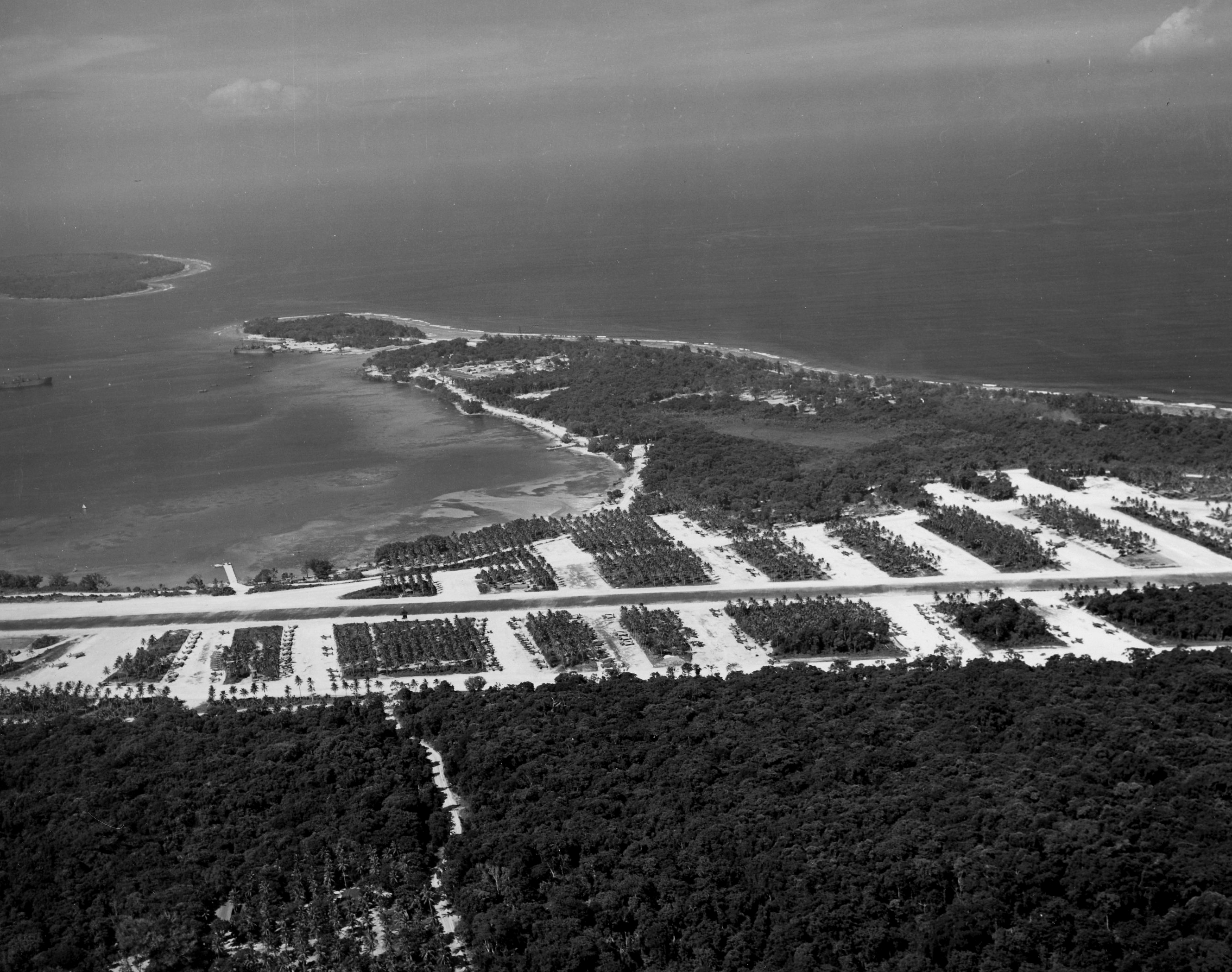

Site information
- Type: Military Airfield
- Controlled by: United States Navy; Royal New Zealand Air Force
- Condition: abandoned

Location
- Coordinates: 15°30′06″S 167°14′45″E

Site history
- Built: 1942
- Built by: Seebees
- In use: 1942-5
- Materials: Coral

Palikulo Bay Airfield or Bomber Field #1 is a former World War II airfield on the island of Espiritu Santo in the New Hebrides Islands at the Espiritu Santo Naval Base.

== History ==
=== World War II ===
The 7th Naval Construction Battalion arrived on Santo on 11 August 1942 and began construction of more extensive air facilities to support the Guadalcanal Campaign. After completing a second fighter airfield at Turtle Bay they began constructing a bomber field at Palikulo Bay. The runway was 5,000 feet (1,500 m) by 150 feet (46 m) built of PSP over a coral base. The 15th Naval Construction Battalion arrived on Santo on 13 October 1942 and added taxiways, revetments, and a 1,000 feet (300 m) extension to the runway for air transport operation.

Units of the 5th Bombardment Group based at Palikulo included the 23d Bombardment Squadron operating B-17Es and later B-24s from 1 December 1942 until 3 January 1944, and the 72d Bombardment Squadron and 394th Bombardment Squadron both operating B-17s. On 13 August B-17E #41-2463 of the 394th Bombardment Squadron piloted by Gene Roddenberry crashed on takeoff due to mechanical failure.

Navy and USMC units based at Palikulo included:

- VMD-154 operating PB4Ys
- VMD-254 operating B-24s
- VMO-250 operating J2Fs.

Following the sinking of the USS Wasp (CV-7) on 15 September 1942, VF-71 operating F4Fs was temporarily based at Palikulo.

On the nights of 15 and 23 October 1942 Palikulo was shelled by a Japanese submarine however no serious damage resulted.

Royal New Zealand Air Force (RNZAF) units based at Palikulo included:

- No. 1 (Islands) Group Headquarters from 1 March 1943-January 1944
- No. 3 Squadron operating Lockheed Hudsons from 9 October-6 December 1942 and later operating Lockheed Venturas in July 1944
- No. 9 Squadron operating Lockheed Hudsons from March 1943
- No. 14 Squadron operating P-40s from April–June 1943
- No.25 Squadron operating SBDs from 30 January to 22 March 1944

The RNZAF operated a base depot at Palikulo that assembled aircraft that arrived aboard US ships and were then assigned to RNZAF Squadrons.

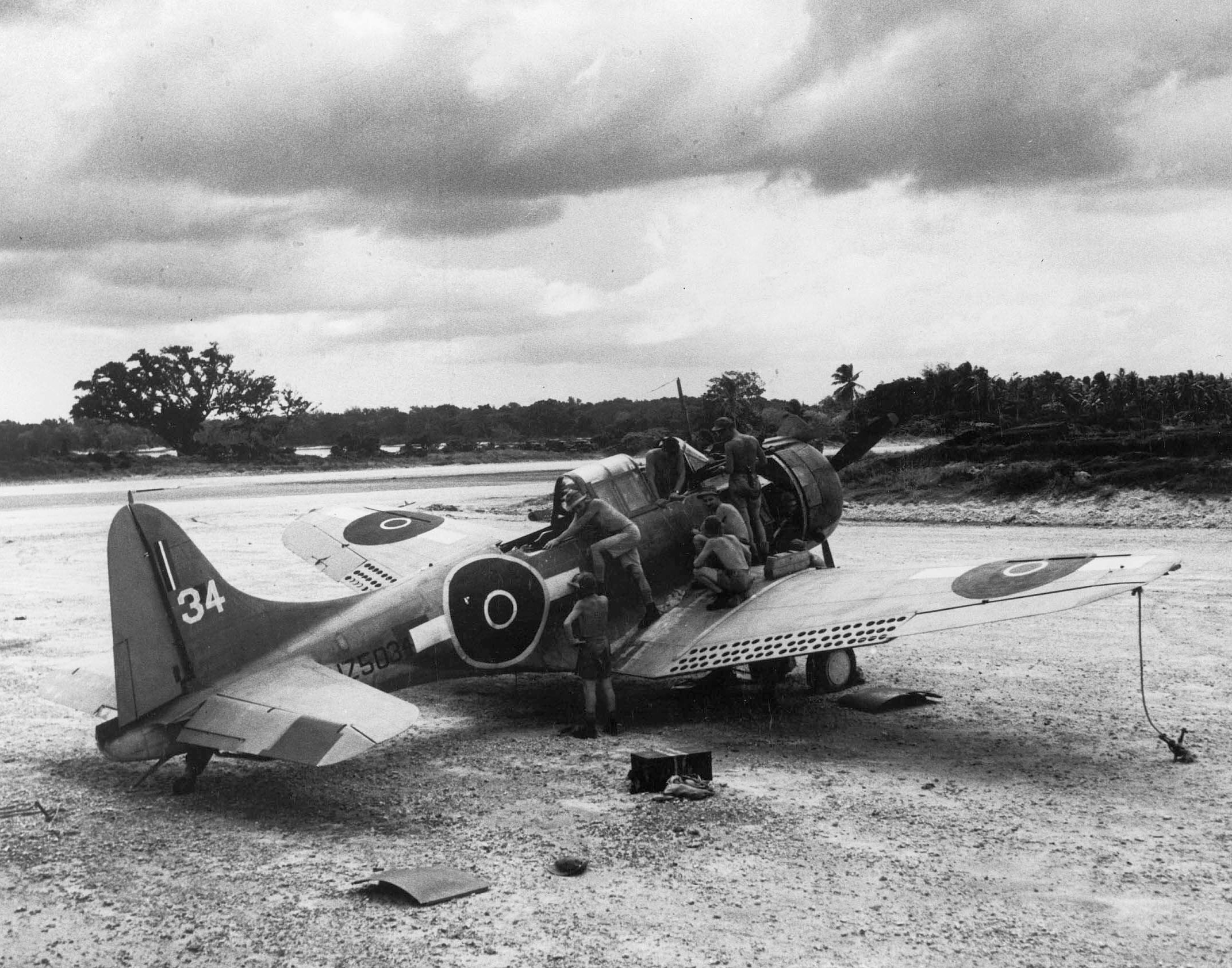
An RNZAF SBD-4 being serviced by ground personnel on Santo in 1943

=== Postwar ===
NOB Espiritu Santo disestablished on 12 June 1946. Part of the airfield forms part of the main road along Palikulo Bay, while the remainder together with all taxiways and base facilities is largely overgrown with vegetation.

== See also ==
- Luganville Airfield
- Luganville Seaplane Base
- Santo-Pekoa International Airport
- Turtle Bay Airfield
