= Canal du Segond =

Canal in Vanuatu

Coordinates: 15°33′41″S 167°09′00″E

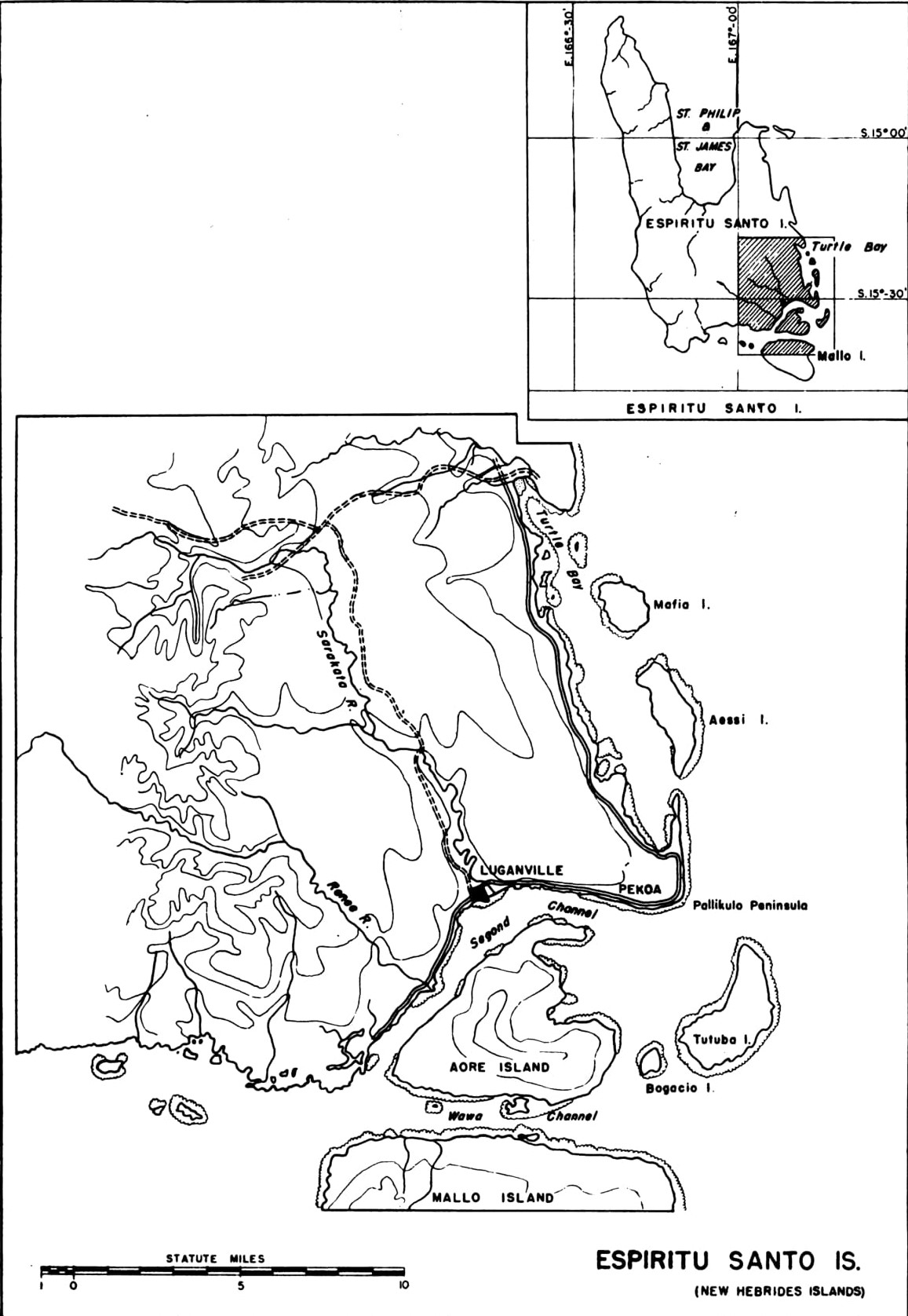
Southern Espiritu Santo showing Segond Channel

Canal du Segond, also known as Canal Pekoa and in English Segond Channel, literally "Second Channel," separates the island of Aore from the city of Luganville on main island of Espiritu Santo, Vanuatu.

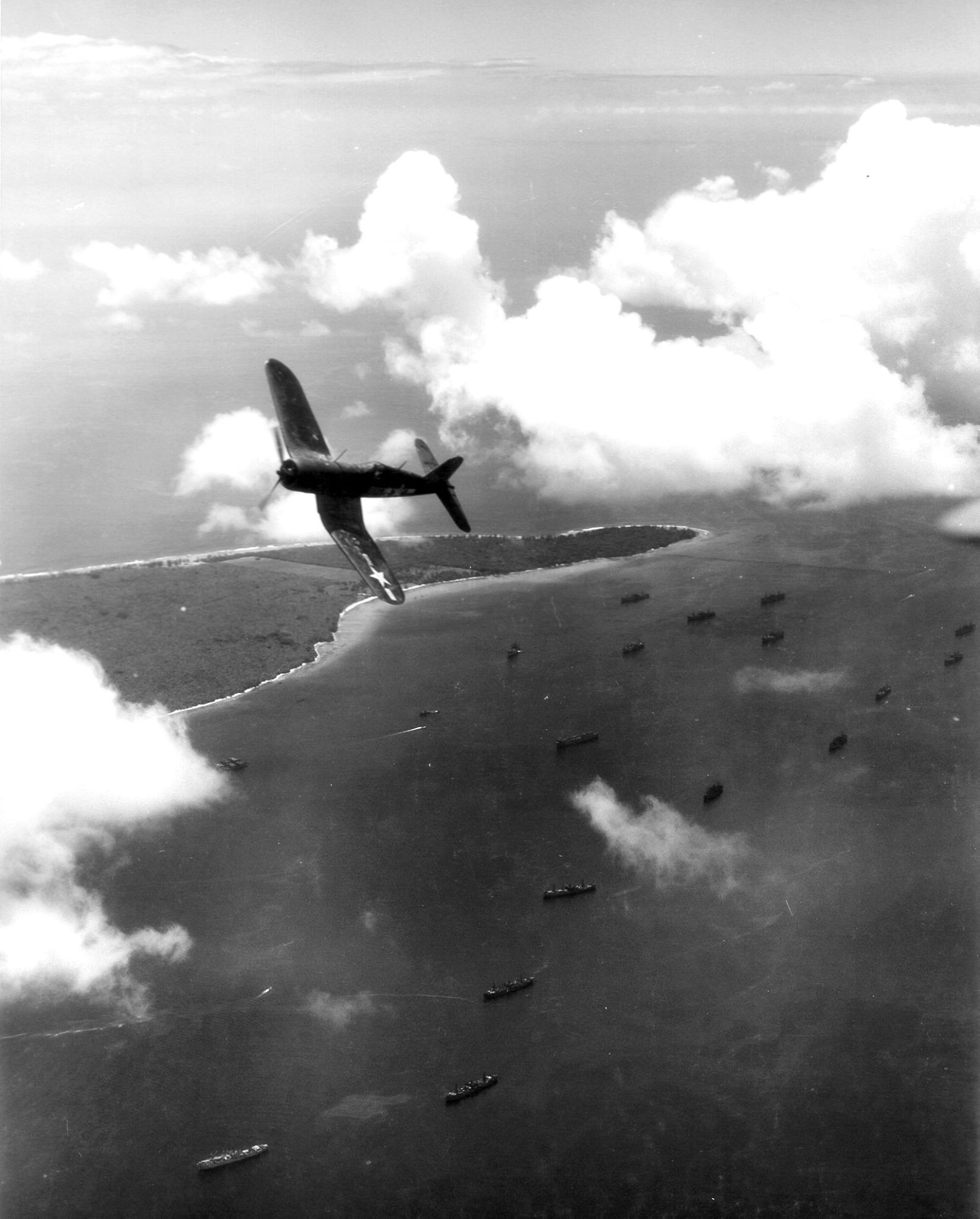
F4U Corsair over Segond Channel, March 1944

The channel was the location of the United States Navy's Naval Advance Base Espiritu Santo during World War II. The channel was a major anchorage for vessels during the war.
