= Luganville Airfield =

Former airfield in Espiritu Santo

- Espiritu Santo, New Hebrides Islands
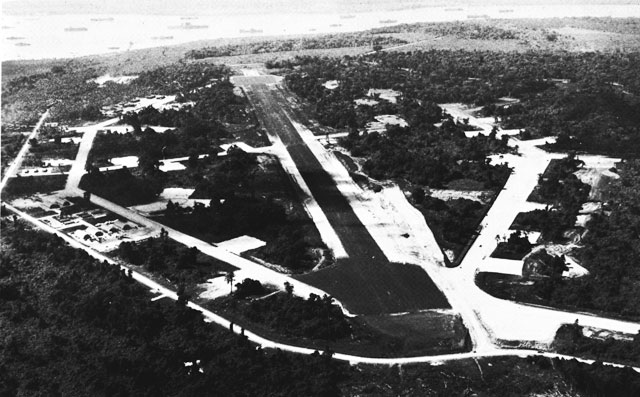
- Aerial view of Luganville Airfield, Espiritu Santo

Site information
- Type: Military Airfield
- Controlled by: United States Army Air Forces
- Condition: abandoned

Location
- Coordinates: 15°30′17″S 167°07′12″E

Site history
- Built: 1943
- Built by: Seebees
- In use: 1943-4
- Materials: Coral

Luganville Airfield or Bomber Field #3 is a former World War II airfield on the island of Espiritu Santo in the New Hebrides Islands at the Espiritu Santo Naval Base.

== History ==
=== World War II ===
The Seabees of the 40th Naval Construction Battalion arrived on Santo on 3 February 1943 and were tasked with building a third bomber field in dense jungle to the west of Luganville. By July the Battalion had completed a 6,800 feet (2,100 m) by 300 feet (91 m) coral runway, with 27,000 feet (8,200 m) of taxiways and 75 hardstands. Additional facilities constructed included a tank farm of six 1,000-barrel steel tanks, two truck-loading stations, two repair areas, fifteen 40 feet (12 m) by 10 feet (3.0 m) arch-rib warehouses, one 100 feet (30 m) by 90 feet (27 m) hangar, eighteen quonset huts for living quarters, six mess halls, and all necessary utilities. 15 miles (24 km) of two-lane access and supply roads, were cut through dense jungle.

VP-44 operating PBY-5s operated from Luganville from 11 March 1944 until 15 June 1944 when it moved to Nissan Island.

VMF-323 was based at Luganville from 29 October 1944 until 23 February 1945 when it moved to Okinawa.

No. 30 Squadron RNZAF also operated from the base in February 1944 before moving forward to Piva Airfield.

=== Postwar ===
NOB Espiritu Santo disestablished on 12 June 1946. The airfield remained in use as a civilian airstrip until the early 1970s however as it was on higher ground it was often clouded in and so it was decided to move all operations to the former Bomber Field No.2 which became Santo-Pekoa International Airport. The field is now largely overgrown with vegetation.

== See also ==
- Luganville Seaplane Base
- Palikulo Bay Airfield
- Santo International Airport
- Turtle Bay Airfield
