= Cyrus Kay =

New Zealand aviator and military leader (1902– 1993)

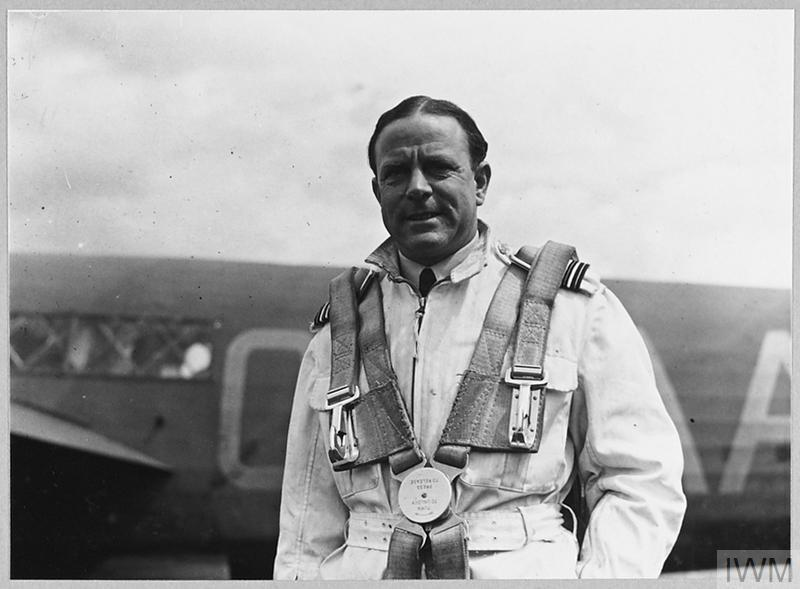
- Cyrus Kay
- Born: Cyril Eyton Kay; 25 June 1902; Auckland, New Zealand
- Died: 29 April 1993 (aged 90); London, United Kingdom
- Military career
- Allegiance: New Zealand
- Branch: Royal Air Force (1926–1931); Royal New Zealand Air Force (1935–1958)
- Service years: 1926–1931; 1935–1958
- Rank: Air Vice-Marshal
- Commands: Chief of the Air Staff (1956–58); Wigram Air Base (1944–46); Ohakea Air Base (1943–44); No. 75 Squadron (1940–41)
- Conflicts: Second World War
- Awards: Companion of the Order of the Bath; Commander of the Order of the British Empire; Distinguished Flying Cross

Air Vice-Marshal Cyril Eyton Kay, CB, CBE, DFC (25 June 1902 – 29 April 1993), known as Cyrus Kay, was a New Zealand aviator and military leader. Born in Auckland, Kay joined the Royal Air Force in 1926 for a five-year period of service, during which he attempted to break the record for the fastest flight from England to Australia. He remained in aviation in civilian life and was a participant in the MacRobertson Air Race of 1934.

Kay joined the Royal New Zealand Air Force (RNZAF) in 1935 and, on the outbreak of the Second World War in 1939, he was in England preparing to ferry to New Zealand a Vickers Wellington bomber purchased by the New Zealand government for the RNZAF. He became part of No. 75 Squadron, flying Wellingtons on bombing operations. Awarded the Distinguished Flying Cross for his performance on one such operation, he later commanded the squadron for several months. Later in the war he served in New Zealand as commander of a number of RNZAF bases. After the war, he remained in the RNZAF, rising to the rank of air vice-marshal and serving as Chief of the Air Staff from 1956 until his retirement in 1958. He died in London, aged 90.

== Early life ==
Cyril Eyton Kay, usually known as Cyrus, was born in Auckland, New Zealand, on 25 June 1902. His parents were David Kay, an accountant, and his wife Mary née Butts. The Kay family later lived in Devonport and Māngere. He was educated at Seddon Memorial Technical College. While a student, he experienced flying for the first time. Going farming after completing his schooling, he soon applied to join the New Zealand Permanent Air Force, the precursor to the Royal New Zealand Air Force (RNZAF). Unsuccessful, he went to England in an attempt to join the Royal Air Force (RAF).

== Military career ==
With the support of John Jellicoe, 1st Earl Jellicoe, the former Governor-General of New Zealand, Kay was granted a five-year short service commission in the RAF on 14 July 1926. Attending the Central Flying School he achieved an 'above average' rating on graduation. He served on army co-operation duties and also became an expert in meteorology and navigation. This knowledge and experience was helpful when he attempted to break the record of 15 days, 12 hours, for flying from England to Australia in 1930 with H. Piper, another New Zealander serving in the RAF, as a co-pilot. The duo departed on 9 February in a Desoutter monoplane purchased with funds obtained through the sale of Piper's farm in New Zealand. The flight took over six weeks to complete, arriving in Sydney on 2 April after a number of forced landings along the way. Kay described it in media as "a terrific struggle to get through". He was transferred to the RAF Reserve in November 1931 having completed his five-year term of service.

Kay became a civilian pilot, instructing at Digby in Lincolnshire. He also went to Germany, where he learnt gliding. In 1934, he competed in the MacRobertson Air Race, a London-to-Melbourne flight, celebrating the centenary of Melbourne, flying a twin-engined de Havilland Dragon Rapide, with two other New Zealanders as co-pilot and wireless operator respectively. They finished fifth in the race, and then flew onto New Zealand and became the first persons to complete a direct flight from England to New Zealand.

In 1935, Kay joined the RNZAF as a flying officer, relinquishing his commission in the RAF reserve to do so. By 1938 he was an instructor at Wigram Air Base in Christchurch, teaching navigation. In the 1939 King's Birthday Honours, Kay was appointed an Officer of the Order of the British Empire. By this time Kay held the rank of squadron leader and was in England, learning to fly Vickers Wellington bombers. He was part of a group of RNZAF personnel preparing to ferry six Wellingtons, purchased by the New Zealand government for the RNZAF, back to New Zealand.

== Second World War ==
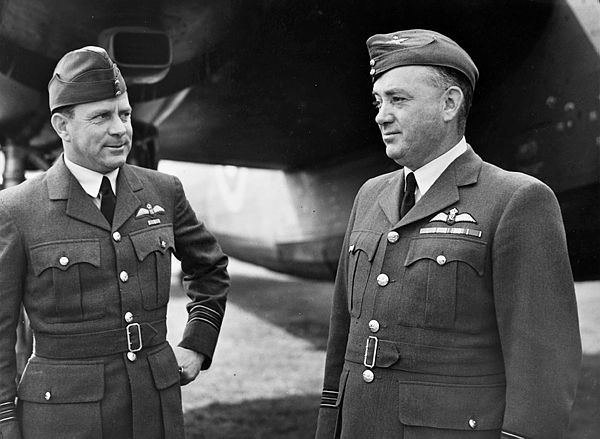
Kay, on the left, with Maurice Buckley, the first commander of No. 75 (NZ) Squadron

On the outbreak of the Second World War, the New Zealand government made the Wellington bombers it had purchased, 30 in total, and the RNZAF personnel receiving training on them, available for use by the RAF. It was agreed to form a New Zealand squadron, designated No. 75 (NZ) Squadron, using the New Zealanders already in England and supplemented with British flight crew as required. Ground personnel were to be provided by the RAF. While the formation of the squadron was being organised, training was now focussed on becoming operational rather than transport duties as was the case before the war.

Despite not being officially formed until 1 April 1940, the squadron commenced operations a few days earlier, flying from RAF Feltwell. Its first mission was to drop propaganda leaflets over Northern Germany, with Kay flying one of the three Wellingtons involved. During the mission, his wireless failed but he was able to successfully navigate to the drop zone over Dorum. In June, as the fighting in France and Belgium intensified, the squadron carried out several bombing missions to targets on the continent. For one of these, an attack on German formations in Belgium, he was awarded the Distinguished Flying Cross (DFC). Announced in the London Gazette, the published citation read:

This officer was captain of an aircraft ordered to attack important targets in the forests south of Bourlers and Baileux during a night in June. In spite of extremely difficult conditions, and in the face of severe opposition, he successfully bombed the objective, starting several fires which gave accurate direction to other aircraft of this sortie. He then descended to a low altitude and, again in the face of heavy opposition, attacked the woods with all his machine guns. Sqn. Ldr. Kay has conducted a number of operations in recent weeks and has shown daring, determination and outstanding ability.

— London Gazette, No. 34878, 21 June 1940.

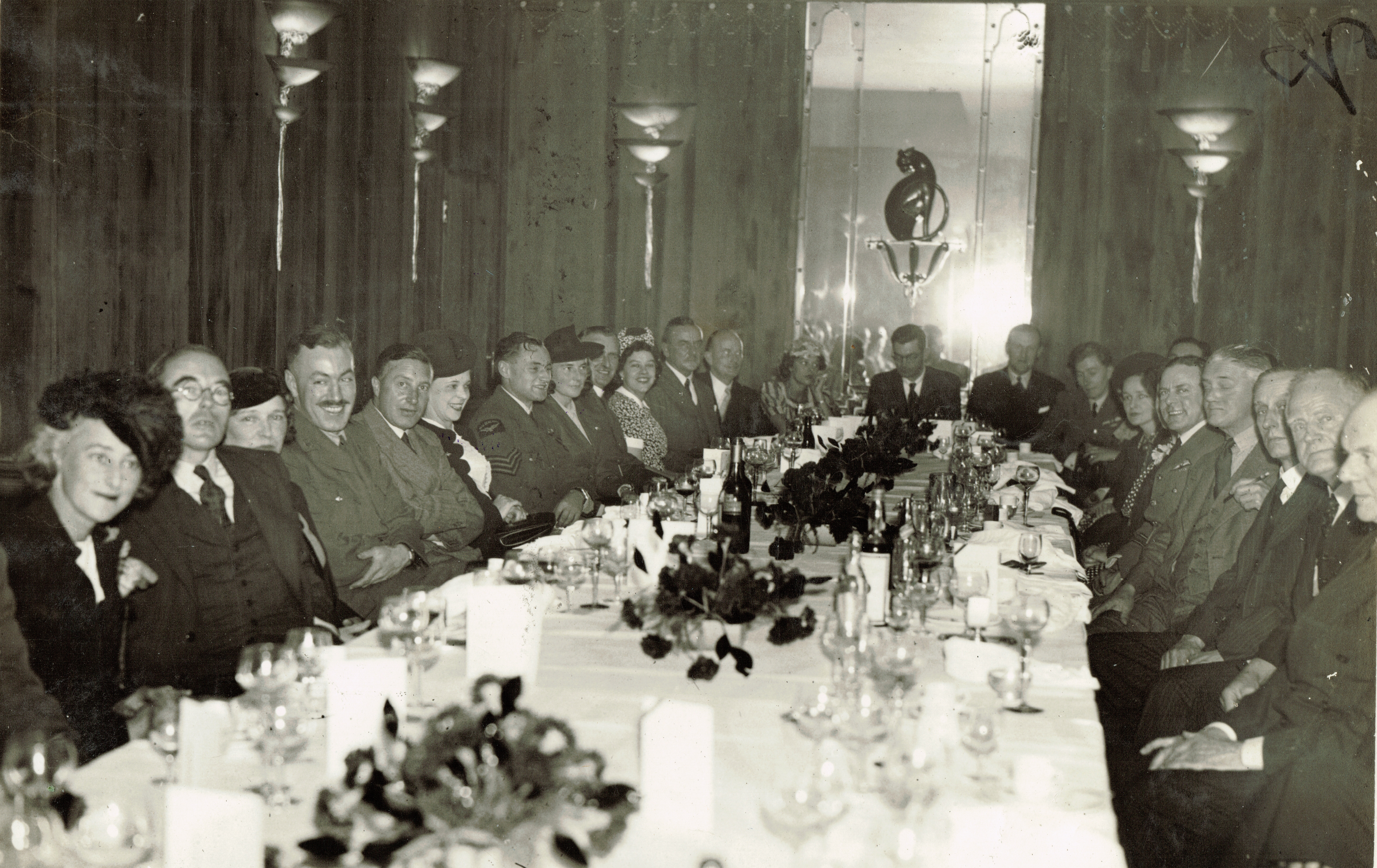
Luncheon at the Savoy Hotel in honor of Victoria Cross recipient Sergeant James Ward, of No. 75 Squadron, July 1941

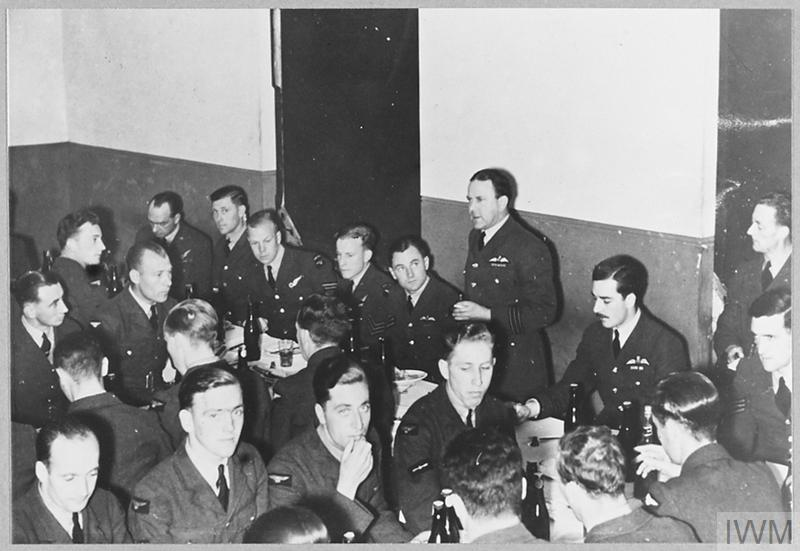
Kay gives a speech at a dinner for Sergeant James Ward of No. 75 Squadron, who is seated on his right and had just been awarded the Victoria Cross

Kay was presented with his DFC in a ceremony at Buckingham Palace in September. Two months later, he took command of No. 75 Squadron after the original commander, Maurice Buckley, departed. He led the squadron for several months as it carried out numerous bombing operations, mainly to Germany but also to Italy. In September 1941, he was posted to a headquarters role and later served on the staff of No. 8 Bomber Group. In late 1942, he returned to New Zealand to take command of the RNZAF navigation school at New Plymouth. Promoted to group captain, he later commanded the Ohakea Air Base in 1944, before moving on to a similar position at Wigram.

== Post-war period ==
After the end of the war, Kay attended the Imperial Defence College and then, promoted to air commodore, had a period of service on the Air Board, being responsible for supply. In this capacity, he helped bring jet aircraft, such as the de Havilland Vampire, into service with the RNZAF. In the 1948 New Year Honours, he was promoted to Commander of the Order of the British Empire. In 1951 he became commander of the RNZAF headquarters in London, remaining in the post for two years until returning to the Air Board, this time with responsibility for personnel. In 1953, he was awarded the Queen Elizabeth II Coronation Medal.

In June 1956, Kay was appointed chief of the air staff (CAS) of the RNZAF, in the rank of air vice-marshal. During his time in this role, he oversaw the disbandment of the Territorial Air Force and also ended compulsory military service in the RNZAF. Kay was appointed a Companion of the Order of the Bath in the 1958 New Year Honours. His term as CAS ended in June 1958, at which time he retired.

== Later life ==
In his later years, Kay wrote an autobiography, published as The Restless Sky in 1964. His retirement years were spent in Wellington and the United Kingdom and he died in London on 29 April 1993. He was survived by his wife, Florence née Armfield, who he had married in 1932. The couple had two daughters. Eyton Kay Road in Hobsonville, a suburb of Auckland, is named for him.

== Notes ==
Military offices
Preceded by Walter Merton	Chief of the Air Staff (RNZAF); 1956–1958	Succeeded by Malcolm Calder
