= Ian Morrison (RNZAF officer) =

New Zealand aviator and military leader (1914–1997)

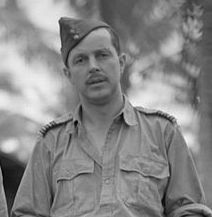
- Wing Commander Morrison in 1943
- Born: 16 March 1914; Hanmer Springs, New Zealand
- Died: 5 September 1997 (aged 83)
- Military career
- Allegiance: New Zealand
- Branch: Royal Air Force (1936–1939); Royal New Zealand Air Force (1939–1966)
- Service years: 1936–1966
- Rank: Air Vice-Marshal
- Commands: Chief of Air Staff (1962–66); No. 3 Squadron (1944–45)
- Conflicts: Second World War: Solomons campaign
- Awards: Companion of the Order of the Bath; Commander of the Order of the British Empire

Air Vice-Marshal Ian Gordon Morrison, CB, CBE (16 March 1914 – 5 September 1997) was a New Zealand aviator and military leader who served with the Royal New Zealand Air Force (RNZAF) during the Second World War. He later served as the Chief of Air Staff (CAS) of the RNZAF.

Born in Hanmer Springs, Morrison briefly served in the Royal Air Force before transferring to the RNZAF in 1939. During the early stages of the Second World War, he was a bomber pilot with No. 75 Squadron, which was formed mostly with New Zealand personnel and operated Vickers Wellingtons. He returned to New Zealand in 1940 for instructing duties and then was a staff officer with the RNZAF's No. 1 Islands Group, based in Vanuatu. He later commanded No. 3 Squadron during the Solomons campaign. After the war, he held a series of staff posts before becoming CAS in 1962. In this capacity he replaced much of the RNZAF's dated equipment and sought to improve its strike capacity. Appointed a Companion of the Order of the Bath in 1965, he retired the following year. He died in 1997, aged 83.

== Early life ==
Ian Gordon Morrison was born in Hanmer Springs, in the South Island of New Zealand on 16 March 1914, the only son of W. G. Morrison and his wife. The town was the site of the Queen Mary Hospital which, during the First World War, was a facility for the treatment of wounded soldiers. Seeing these wounded war veterans in his childhood, Morrison resolved to never join the army. Instead, he desired a career in the Royal Air Force (RAF). After completing his schooling, he worked in the forestry industry to earn the money for the trip to England. During this time he learnt to fly, gaining his pilot's licence at the Canterbury Aero Club.

When Morrison arrived in London, his application to join the RAF was declined on the grounds of a weak heart. A subsequent attempt to join the RAF was successful, and he was accepted for a short service commission in March 1936 on probation, and this was confirmed, along with his rank of pilot officer, on 6 January 1937. In July the following year he was promoted to flying officer and was posted to No. 44 Squadron, based at RAF Waddington. In September 1938 he married Dorothy née Franks at Winthorpe.

== Second World War ==
In January 1939, Morrison resigned his commission in the RAF and subsequently joined the Royal New Zealand Air Force (RNZAF). Later in the year he was sent to England to join other New Zealand personnel being trained on Vickers Wellington medium bombers. The aircraft had been purchased by the New Zealand government for the RNZAF and Morrison was part of the group preparing to ferry them back to New Zealand.

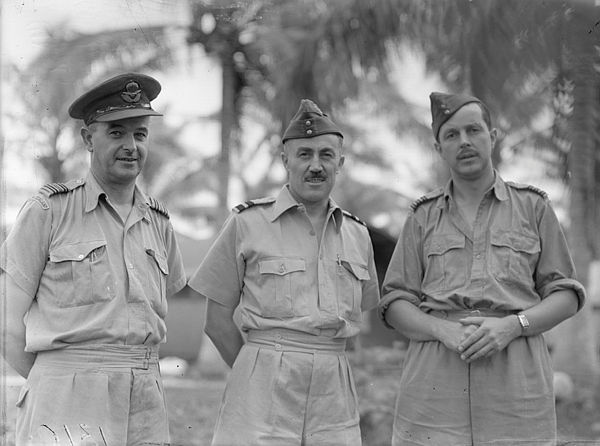
Morrison stands on the right, next to Air Commodore Sidney Wallingford, commander of No. 1 Islands Group, 1943

On the outbreak of the Second World War, Morrison became part of No. 75 Squadron, established around those RNZAF personnel. He went on fly operationally with the squadron until his return to New Zealand in 1940, take up a position as an instructor. A navigation specialist, he taught at the School of General Reconnaissance and was highly regarded for his work. He was promoted to squadron leader in February 1942 and six months later was appointed commander of No. 8 Squadron, which flew Vickers Vildebeests. Early the following year, the RNZAF established the No. 1 (Islands) Group to co-ordinate the administration of the increasing numbers of units being sent to the Pacific theatre of operations to participate in the Solomons campaign. Based at Santo in Vanuatu, it was led by Air Commodore Sidney Wallingford with Morrison joining in April as his senior air staff officer.

Morrison was later promoted wing commander and appointed to command of No. 3 Squadron, which operated Lockheed Ventura light bombers. He served in this capacity from February 1944 to June 1945. During this time, the squadron saw service at Santo, Guadalcanal, Bougainville, and Emirau before finishing its war at Green Island.

== Post-war career ==
Morrison was appointed an Officer of the Order of the British Empire in the 1946 War Honours, in recognition of his war service in the Pacific. He served in a number of staff roles in the postwar period; from June 1946, he was an honorary aide-de-camp to Lieutenant General Bernard Freyberg, the Governor-General of New Zealand, for nearly a year, in 1947, he was based at the Air Department in Wellington as Director of Organisation and Staff Duties, and then served as chairman of the planning executive.

In 1950, Morrison went to the United Kingdom to attend the Joint Services Staff College followed by a two-year period of exchange duty with the RAF. He then commanded Ohakea air base for a time. In 1953, he was awarded the Queen Elizabeth II Coronation Medal.

From October 1954, Morrison served on the Air Board, being responsible for supply. He was appointed a Commander of the Order of the British Empire in the 1957 New Year Honours. The following year, he attended the Imperial Defence College.

== Chief of Air Staff ==
Morrison was appointed Chief of Air Staff (CAS) in July 1962. At the time, the RNZAF was in decline, operating dated equipment and the New Zealand government more focussed on its army co-operation role. He set about improving the strike capability of the RNZAF in response to the threat posed by communism. During his tenure he oversaw the introduction of American aircraft into service with the RNZAF, including the Lockheed P-3 Orion and the Lockheed C-130 Hercules. He prioritised equally what he saw as the three basic functions of the RNZAF; strike, maritime reconnaissance, and transport. For the latter two roles he initially believed the Hercules could fulfill these but he was convinced against this by his Assistant Chief of Air Staff, Air Commodore William Stratton. This led to the acquisition of the Orion, an anti-submarine patrol aircraft, for which Stratton had made a favourable assessment.

Helicopters also entered service with the RNZAF during his tenure, with a number of Bell UH-1 Iroquois being acquired in 1965. For offensive operations, Morrison favoured the acquisition of the McDonnell Douglas F-4 Phantom as a strike aircraft for the RNZAF but was unable to secure them before his term as CAS ended. Cost was a factor together with the government's preference that RNZAF assume a defensive role.

In the 1965 New Year Honours, Morrison was made a Companion of the Order of the Bath. He retired in June 1966, the morale of the RNZAF considerably improved despite his failure to modernise its strike wing. Four years later a fleet of Douglas A-4 Skyhawks entered service with the RNZAF, improving its offensive capabilities.

== Later life ==
In 1967, Morrison was appointed deputy chief scout and national president of the Scout Association of New Zealand. In 1977, he was awarded New Zealand scouting's highest honour, the Silver Tui. Also in 1977, he received the Queen Elizabeth II Silver Jubilee Medal.

Morrison died on 5 September 1997. He was cremated and his ashes were interred at North Shore Memorial Park. The father of broadcaster Judy Bailey, a street in the Hobsonville, in Auckland, is named for him.

== Notes ==
Military offices
| Preceded by Malcolm Calder | Chief of the Air Staff (RNZAF); 1962–1966 | Succeeded by Cameron Turner |
