= James Allen Ward =

Recipient of the Victoria Cross

James Allen Ward VC
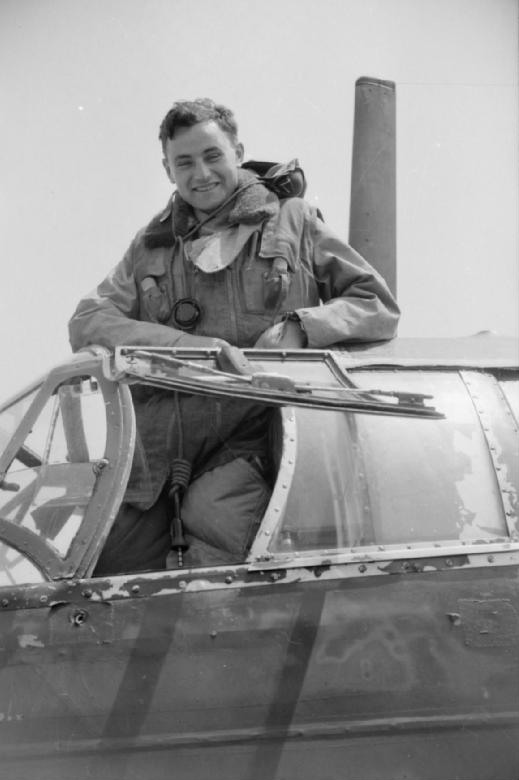
- Sergeant James Allen Ward standing in the cockpit of his Vickers Wellington at Feltwell, Norfolk, July 1941
- Born: 14 June 1919; Wanganui, New Zealand
- Died: 15 September 1941 (aged 22) over Hamburg, Germany
- Burial place: Commonwealth War Grave Cemetery Ohlsdorf, Hamburg
- Military career
- Allegiance: New Zealand
- Branch: Royal New Zealand Air Force
- Service years: 1940–1941
- Rank: Sergeant Pilot
- Units: No. 75 Squadron
- Conflicts: Second World War
- Awards: Victoria Cross

James Allen Ward, VC (14 June 1919 – 15 September 1941) was a New Zealand aviator and a recipient of the Victoria Cross (VC), the highest award for gallantry "in the face of the enemy" that could be awarded at the time to personnel of the British and Commonwealth forces.

Born in Wanganui, Ward was a teacher when the Second World War began. He immediately volunteered for the Royal New Zealand Air Force and after completing flight training in New Zealand, travelled to England. In mid-1941, he was posted to No. 75 Squadron, which operated Vickers Wellington bombers. He participated in his first few bombing missions as a co-pilot, during the last of which, on 7 July 1941, he earned the VC for his feat in climbing out onto the wing of his Wellington bomber to extinguish an engine fire caused by a night fighter attack. Ward was the first of three New Zealand airmen to be awarded the VC during the Second World War. He was killed two months later commanding his own Wellington on a bombing mission to Germany.

== Early life ==
James Allen Ward was born on 14 June 1919 in Wanganui, New Zealand, to English immigrants, Percy Harold and Ada May Ward (nee Stokes). He was educated at Wanganui Technical College and after graduation, trained as a teacher in Wellington. Having qualified in 1939, he had just accepted a teaching position at Castlecliff School in Wanganui when the Second World War broke out. Ward immediately volunteered for the Royal New Zealand Air Force (RNZAF).

== Second World War ==
=== Training ===
Despite being quick to enlist in the RNZAF, Ward was not called up until 1 July 1940, when he reported to Levin for initial training. He then proceeded to No. 1 Elementary Flying Training School at RNZAF Taieri, followed by more advanced courses at Wigram Air Base in Christchurch. He was rated as a pilot of high average ability and of confident and reliable character. During his period of flight training, one of his classmates was Fraser Barron, who went on to become a notable bomber pilot during the war.

Ward qualified as a pilot on 18 January 1941 and was promoted to sergeant shortly thereafter. At the end of the month he departed for England aboard the troopship Aorangi, to commence service with the Royal Air Force (RAF). On arrival, he was selected for training on heavy bombers and posted to 20 Bomber Operational Training Unit RAF, in Scotland. Upon completion of his courses at RAF Lossiemouth in mid-1941, Ward was posted to No. 75 Squadron. According to Hugh Kimpton, a fellow New Zealander at Lossiemouth, only one place was available at the squadron at the time. Ward was selected as a result of winning a coin toss between Kimpton and him.

=== Service with No. 75 Squadron ===
No. 75 Squadron was an RAF unit formed around a core of RNZAF flying personnel present in England prior to the outbreak of the Second World War to take delivery of 30 Vickers Wellington bombers purchased by the New Zealand government. These personnel had set up a unit at RAF Marham, in Norfolk, to prepare for the transportation of the Wellingtons back to New Zealand. However, once hostilities commenced, with the permission of the New Zealand government, the fliers were transferred to the Royal Air Force. Shortly afterwards, it was arranged for the RNZAF personnel to form the cadre of No. 75 Squadron, the first Commonwealth squadron of Bomber Command. At the time of Ward's arrival at the squadron, it was based at the RAF's base at Feltwell in Norfolk, and operating Wellington bombers. His first operational flight was made on 14 June, as a second pilot to Squadron Leader Reuben Widdowson, a Canadian, on a bombing mission to Düsseldorf in Germany. Over the next few weeks, he flew six more bombing missions accompanying Widdowson.

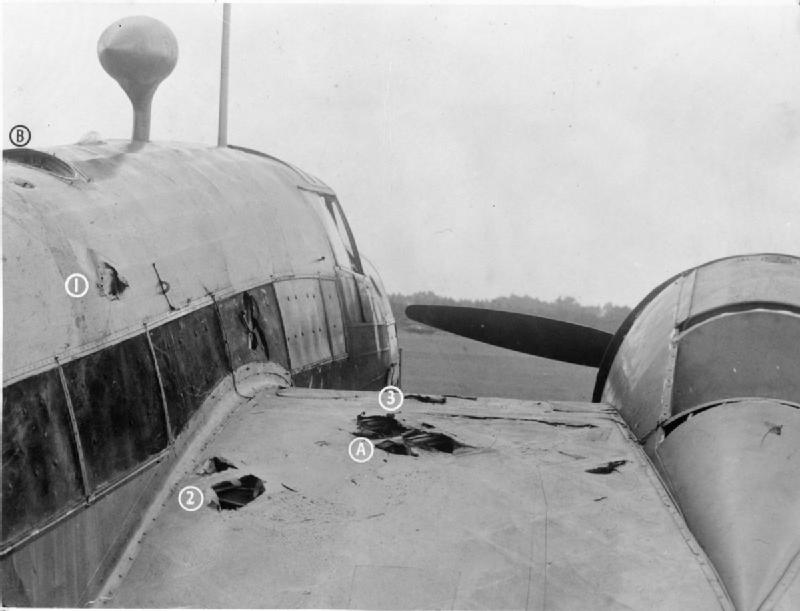
The Wellington in which Ward flew on operations on 7 July 1941. Shown are the holes Ward made to help him climb across the wing in order to put out a fire caused by a night fighter attack

Widdowson and Ward flew their sixth and last mission together on 7 July during a raid on Münster. While returning home over the Zuider Zee on the Dutch coast, Ward's Wellington was attacked by a German Bf 110 night fighter. A fuel tank in the starboard wing was ruptured, causing a fire around the rear of the starboard engine. After initial attempts to put out the flames using fire extinguishers directed through a hole made in the fuselage failed, Widdowson ordered the crew to bail out. However, Ward proposed that he climb out and try and smother the fire using an engine cover. He crawled out through the astrodome on the top of the fuselage, secured by a rope. Making his way down the side and along the wing of the aircraft, he kicked or tore holes in the fuselage's covering fabric with a fire axe to give himself hand-and foot-holes.

Ward soon reached the engine and attempted to smother the flames with a canvas cover. With the fire out, he stuffed the cover into the hole from which fuel from a damaged petrol line had leaked and exacerbated the fire. Ward, now exhausted, made his way back to the astrodome with the navigator, Sergeant Joe Lawton of the RNZAF, keeping tension on the rope tethered to Ward and assisting him back into the aircraft. Although the cover shortly blew away by the slipstream, the fire had burnt itself out and the plane was now safe. Instead of the crew having to bail out, the aircraft made an emergency landing, without flaps or brakes, at Newmarket. The Wellington ran into a hedge and fence at the end of the runway and was written off.

Ward described his experience out on the wing of the aircraft, exposed to the slipstream, as "...being in a terrific gale only worse than any gale I've ever known". To recognise Ward's courage, the commander of No. 75 Squadron, Wing Commander Cyrus Kay, recommended him for the Victoria Cross (VC). Instituted in 1856, the VC was the highest gallantry award that could be bestowed on military personnel of the British Empire. Kay also recommended Widdowson for the Distinguished Flying Cross and Sergeant Allan Box for the Distinguished Flying Medal. Box, a New Zealander, was the tail gunner of Ward's aircraft and had shot down the night fighter. The awards for Widdowson and Box were immediately approved while Ward's VC was announced on 5 August.

The citation for Ward's VC was published in the London Gazette and read:

On the night of 7 July 1941, Sergeant Ward was second pilot of a Wellington bomber returning from an attack on Munster. While flying over the Zuider Zee at 13,000 feet his aircraft was attacked from beneath by a German Bf 110, which secured hits with cannon-shell and incendiary bullets. The rear gunner was wounded in the foot but delivered a burst of fire sending the enemy fighter down, apparently out of control. Fire then broke out in the Wellington's near-starboard engine and, fed by petrol from a split pipe, quickly gained an alarming hold and threatened to spread to the entire wing. The crew forced a hole in the fuselage and made strenuous efforts to reduce the fire with extinguishers, and even coffee from their flasks, without success. They were then warned to be ready to abandon the aircraft. As a last resort Sergeant Ward volunteered to make an attempt to smother the fire with an engine cover which happened to be in use as a cushion. At first he proposed discarding his parachute to reduce wind resistance, but was finally persuaded to take it. A rope from the aircraft dingy was tied to him, though this was of little help and might have become a danger had he been blown off the aircraft.

With the help of his navigator he then climbed through the narrow astrodome and put on his parachute. The bomber was flying at a reduced speed but the wind pressure must have been sufficient to render the operation one of extreme difficulty. Breaking the fabric to make hand and foot holds where necessary and also taking advantage of existing holes in the fabric, Sergeant Ward succeeded in descending three feet to the wing and proceeding another three feet to a position behind the engine, despite the slipstream from the airscrew which nearly blew him off the wing. Lying in this precarious position he smothered the fire in the wing fabric and tried to push the engine cover into the hole in the wing and on the leaking pipe from which the fire came. As soon as he had removed his hand, however, a terrific wind blew the cover out and when he tried again it was lost. Tired as he was, he was able, with the navigator's assistance, to make a successful but perilous journey back into the aircraft. There was now no danger of fire spreading from the petrol pipe as there was no fabric left near it and in due course it burned itself out. When the aircraft was nearly home, some petrol which had collected in the wing blazed up furiously but died down quite suddenly. A safe landing was made despite the damage sustained to the aircraft. The flight home had been made possible by the gallantry of Sergeant Ward in extinguishing the fire on the wing in circumstances of the greatest difficulty and at the risk of his life.

— The London Gazette, No. 35238, 5 August 1941

Ward's VC was the first of three made to New Zealand airmen during the war; the others awarded were to Squadron Leader Leonard Trent, a bomber pilot, and Flying Officer Lloyd Trigg, a pilot with Coastal Command. According to Clifton Fadiman, a compiler of anecdotes, Ward was summoned to 10 Downing Street soon after the announcement of his VC, by Prime Minister Winston Churchill. The New Zealander was apparently awestruck by the experience and was unable to answer the Prime Minister's questions. Churchill regarded Ward with some compassion. "You must feel very humble and awkward in my presence," he said. "Yes, sir," managed Ward. "Then you can imagine how humble and awkward I feel in yours," said Churchill.

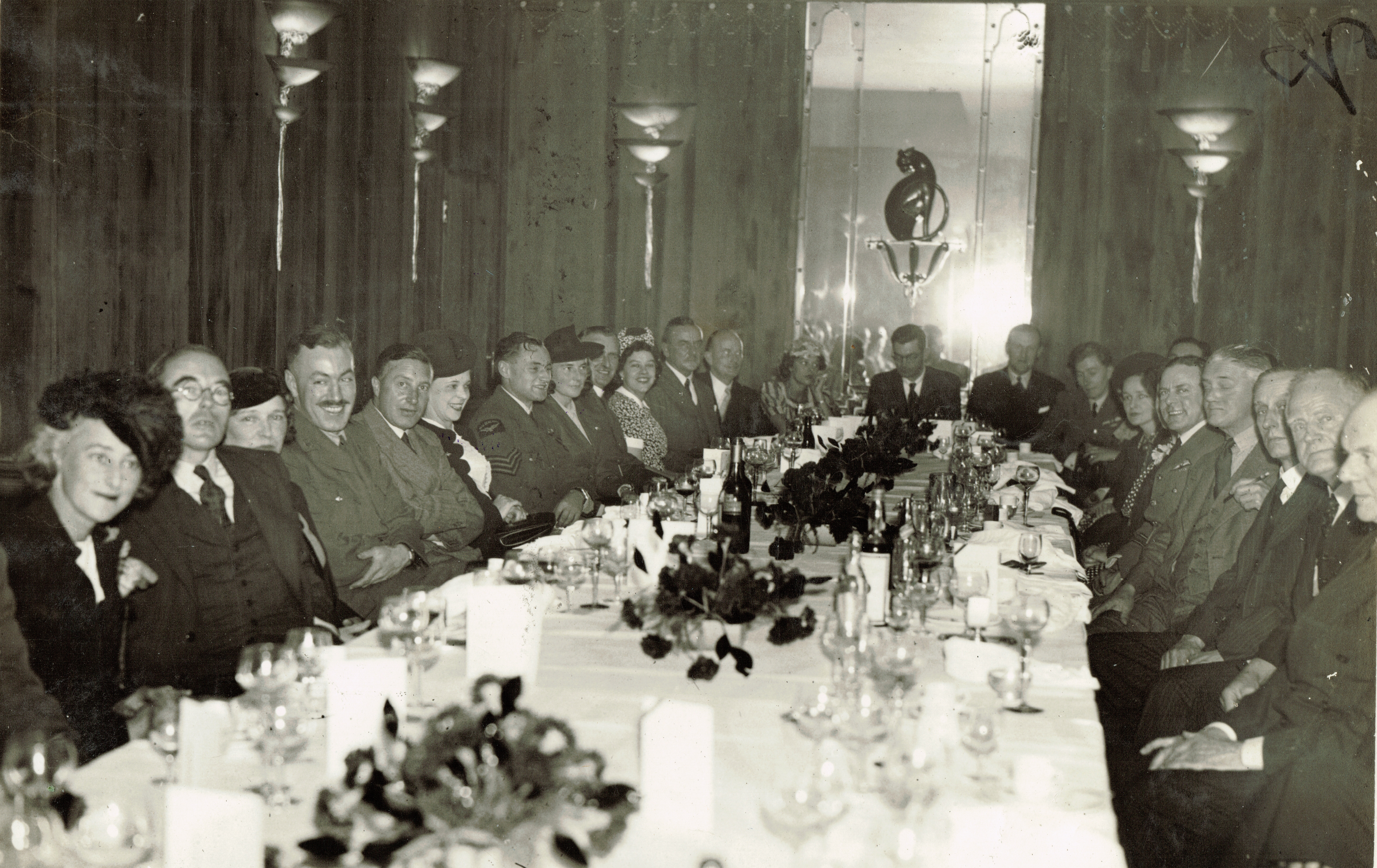
Luncheon at the Savoy Hotel in honor of Ward, July 1941

Ward had a period of leave after receiving his VC. Hector Bolitho, a New Zealander in the Royal Air Force Volunteer Reserve, spent time with him and later recounted an incident when at a dinner, Ward fainted after a fuel from a cigarette lighter was accidentally spilled onto his hand and set alight. Supposedly the event had triggered memories of the flaming wing of his Wellington bomber. A doctor treated the minor burn and gave Ward a note to give to the medical officer at No. 75 Squadron. Bolitho alleged the note stated Ward was not fit to fly but it was never passed on.

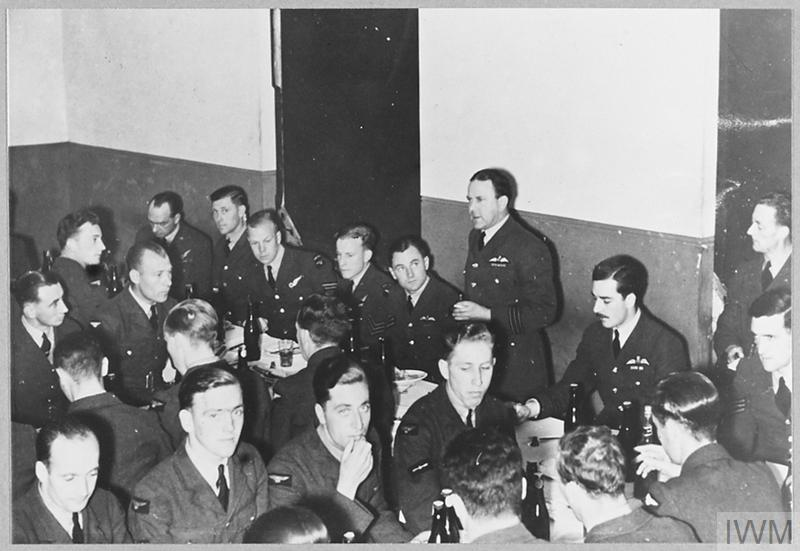
No. 75 Squadron's commander, Cyrus Kay, standing at centre, gives a speech at a dinner held for Ward shortly after he was awarded the VC. Ward sits on Kay's right

On returning to his squadron, Ward was given command of his own crew and aircraft. He flew his first mission as commander to Brest without incident. On his second mission, a raid on Hamburg carried out on 15 September, his Wellington encountered a night fighter shortly after releasing its bombs. Set on fire by the attacking night fighter, Ward ordered his crew to bail out and held his aircraft steady enough for two of his crew to do so; they subsequently became prisoners of war. When the Wellington crashed near Hamburg, the remaining crew and Ward were still on board. It was initially reported that the Wellington had been hit and destroyed by flak. It was not until the two surviving crew members were released from their prisoner of war camp was it determined that a night fighter was involved in the destruction of Ward's aircraft.

Unbeknown to Ward, an official at the Air Ministry had suggested to the New Zealand government that he be returned to New Zealand. It was appreciated that Ward's profile as a result of the VC award would be useful for propaganda and recruitment purposes. He could also have served as an instructor with one of the home-based RNZAF squadrons. On 15 September 1941, the day of Ward's death, Group Captain Hugh Saunders, the Chief of Air Staff of the RNZAF, approved the proposal to return him to New Zealand.

Ward's body was recovered from the wreckage of his aircraft and buried by the Germans in a civilian cemetery. Initially reported in the United Kingdom and New Zealand as missing, presumed dead, at one stage Ward was believed to be a prisoner of war in Germany. Confirmation of his death was officially reported in August 1942 by the International Red Cross. After the war and following official identification, his remains were reinterred in the Commonwealth War Grave Cemetery Ohlsdorf in Hamburg.

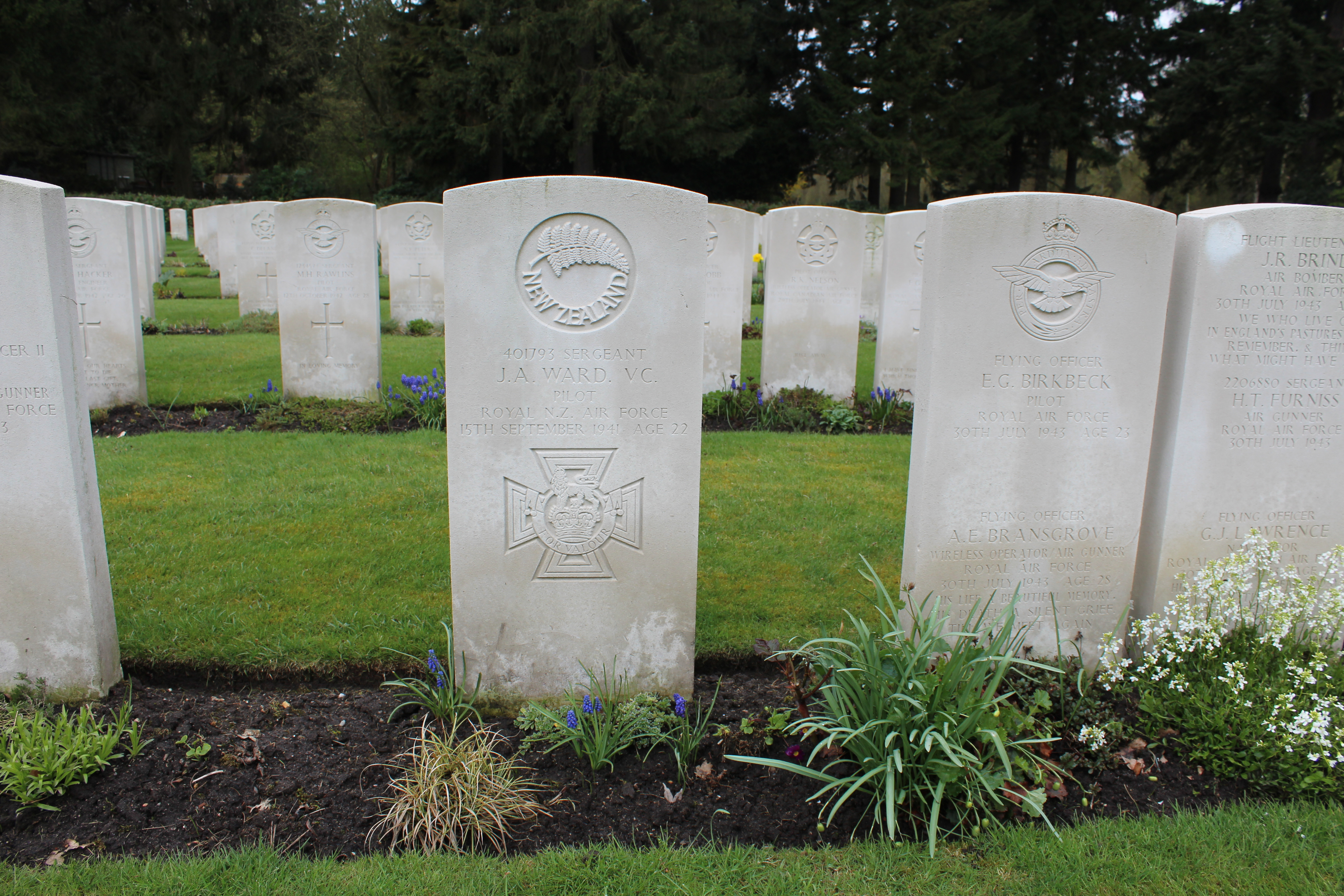
Ward's grave in Hamburg, Germany

== Victoria Cross and legacy ==
Ward's VC was presented to his parents by the Governor General of New Zealand at Government House in Wellington on 16 October 1942. The Ward family loaned Ward's VC and other service medals to the RNZAF for several years until 2006, when they were returned. The medals were subsequently lent to the Auckland War Memorial Museum for display.

There are a number of memorials to Ward, one being a painting by Peter McIntyre, entitled Memorial to Sergeant James Allen Ward, V.C. and depicting Ward's feat, which hangs at the Sarjeant Gallery in Ward's hometown of Wanganui. There is also a plaque honouring him in Queen's Gardens in Dunedin. In November 2004, the Wellington College of Education, in preparation for a merger with Victoria University of Wellington, renamed one of its halls in honour of Ward. On 14 May 2011, the community centre at Feltwell, where Ward had flown from while serving with No. 75 Squadron, was dedicated in his honour. It had served as a sergeant's mess hall during the Second World War.
