= Robert Clark-Hall =

Sir Robert Clark-Hall
- Born: 21 June 1883; London, England
- Died: 8 March 1964 (aged 80)
- Military career
- Allegiance: United Kingdom; New Zealand
- Branch: Royal Navy (1897–18); Royal Air Force (1918–34); Royal New Zealand Air Force (1940–45)
- Service years: 1897–1934; 1940–1945
- Rank: Air Marshal
- Commands: No. 1 (Islands) Group (1944–45); Southern (Training) Group (1943–44); RNZAF Harewood (1940–43); RAF Coastal Area (1931–34); RAF Mediterranean (1925–26); Egyptian Group (1924); No. 29 Group (1919); No. 1 Wing (1917–18); No. 3 Squadron (1915); HMS Ark Royal (1914–15)
- Conflicts: Boxer Rebellion; First World War; Second World War
- Awards: Knight Commander of the Order of the British Empire; Companion of the Order of St Michael and St George; Distinguished Service Order; Mentioned in Despatches; Chevalier of the Legion of Honour (France)

Air Marshal Sir Robert Hamilton Clark-Hall KBE, CMG, DSO (21 June 1883 – 8 March 1964) was a squadron and wing commander in the Royal Naval Air Service during the First World War and a senior Royal Air Force commander in the 1920s and early 1930s. Clark-Hall returned to service during the Second World War after volunteering to serve with the Royal New Zealand Air Force.

== Early life ==
Born in London, England, in 1883, Robert Hamilton Clark-Hall was appointed a sub-lieutenant in the Royal Navy in 1902. He subsequently trained as a pilot, gaining his 'wings' in 1911.

== First World War ==
Commanded the first seaplane carrier HMS Ark Royal at Gallipoli. He then commanded No. 1 Wing Royal Naval Air Service conducting surveillance and attacks on enemy shipping from St Pol-sur-Mer, Dunkirk between September 1916 and November 1918, and was awarded the Chevalier of the Legion of Honour for his services to the war in February 1919.

== Second World War ==
At the outbreak of the Second World War, Clark-Hall was in his late-50s, retired and living in New Zealand. He volunteered to serve with the Royal New Zealand Air Force, and was granted a commission as a wing commander. In May 1940 Clark-Hall was appointed the Officer Commanding RNZAF Harewood. After receiving a promotion to group captain, in 1943 Clark-Hall was promoted again to air commodore and appointed Air Officer Commanding Southern (Training) Group. In October 1944, he became Air Officer Commanding No. 1 (Islands) Group in the Pacific Ocean. He retired from the Royal New Zealand Air Force on 12 September 1945.

== Notes ==
Military offices
Preceded by Charles Lambe	Air Officer Commanding Coastal Area; 1931–1934	Succeeded by Napier Gill; Temporary appointment followed by Arthur Longmore
