= RAF Newmarket =

Former Royal Air Force station in Suffolk, England

RAF Newmarket
- Newmarket, Suffolk in England
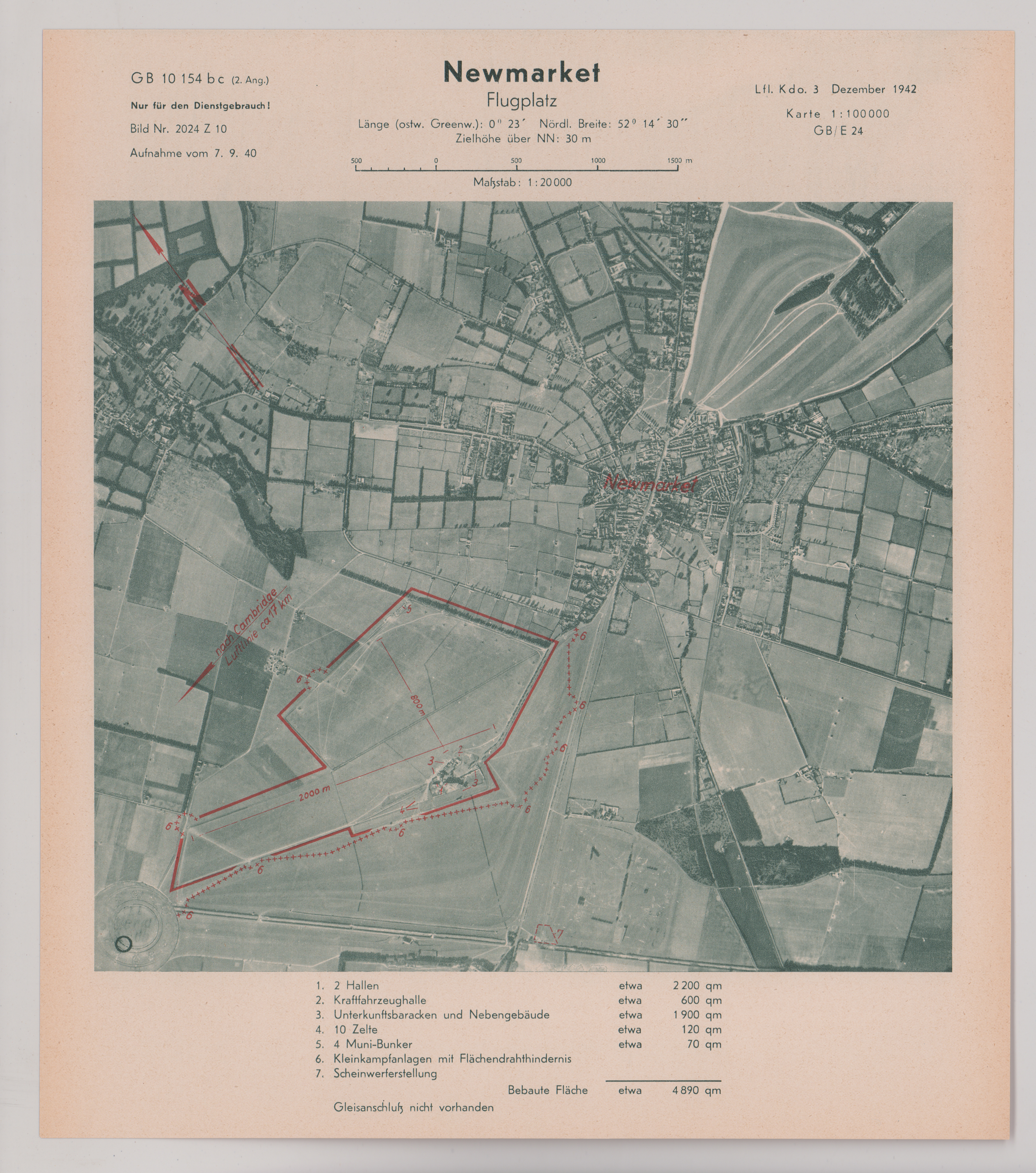
- RAF Newmarket on a target dossier of the German Luftwaffe, 1942

Site information
- Type: Royal Air Force station
- Owner: Air Ministry
- Operator: Royal Air Force
- Controlled by: RAF Bomber Command

Location
- Shown within Suffolk RAF Newmarket (the United Kingdom)
- Coordinates: 52°14′02″N 000°22′11″E

Site history
- Built: 1939
- In use: 1939 - 1945
- Battles/wars: European theatre of World War II

Airfield information
- Elevation: 31 metres (102 ft) AMSL
Runways
Direction	Length and surface
NE/SW	2,000 metres (6,562 ft) Grass
NW/SE	800 metres (2,625 ft) Grass

Royal Air Force Newmarket or more simply RAF Newmarket is a former Royal Air Force station located near Newmarket, Suffolk, England, near the border with Cambridgeshire. It was opened in 1939 and closed in 1945.

== History ==
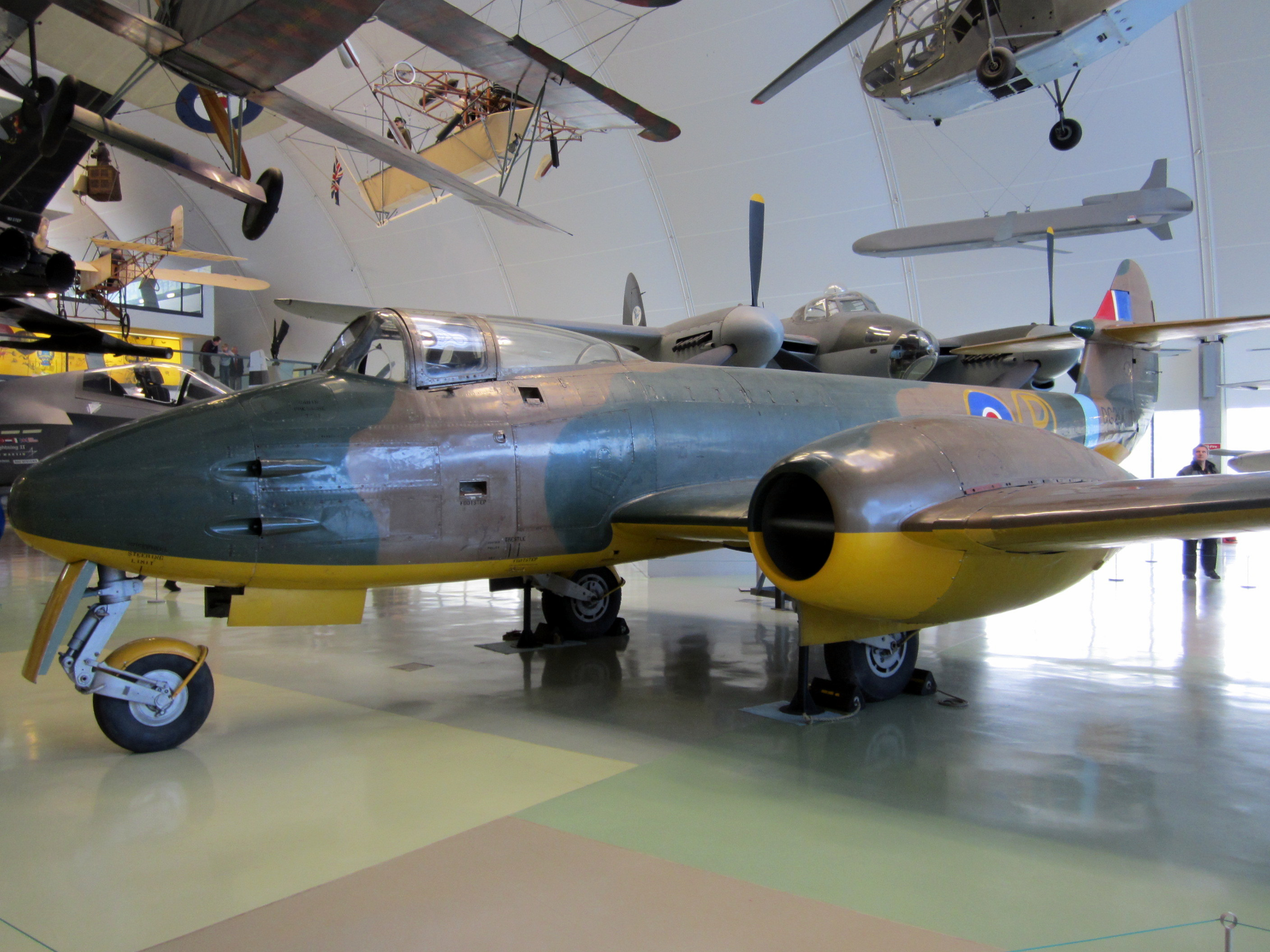
DG202/G, the prototype Gloster Meteor tested at RAF Newmarket, on display at the Royal Air Force Museum London in 2011.

The RAF station was actually a grass-strip on Newmarket's Rowley Mile Racecourse. The grass strip is still used by light aircraft today.

In July and August 1942, ground running and taxiing tests were carried out at RAF Newmarket with a prototype of the new Gloster Meteor jet fighter.

The station was a sub-station of No. 32 Base, 3 Group, RAF Bomber Command, directed from RAF Mildenhall, from April 1942 to February 1945.

In 1944 the station came under the control of No. 3 Group RAF.

The original station was closed in 1945.

In the 1950s-60s a new camp appeared under the name RAF Newmarket on the Dullingham Road. This was a Communications Unit under RAF Signals Command and contained Eastern Communications Centre (Commcen Eastern) and North Eastern Communications Centre (Commcen North East) and staffed mainly by National Service and Regular Personnel. The administration of this camp was from RAF Waterbeach. This was a relay station handling signals traffic between all RAF bases in the Eastern and North Eastern areas.

== Squadrons and units ==
- No. 2 Squadron RAF detachment (1943) – North American Mustang I.
- No. 75 (New Zealand) Squadron RAF (1942–1943) – Short Stirling I & III.
- No. 99 Squadron RAF (1939–1941) – Vickers Wellington I, IA & IC.
- No. 107 Squadron RAF detachment (1939–1941) – Bristol Blenheim I & IV.
- No. 138 Squadron RAF (1941) – Westland Lysander IIIA & Armstrong Whitworth Whitley V.
- No. 161 Squadron RAF (1942) – Westland Lysander IIIA, Lockheed Hudson I & Armstrong Whitworth Whitley V.
- No. 453 Squadron RAAF (1943 for one week) – Supermarine Spitfire VB.

The following units were also here at some point:

- No. 3 Group Communications Flight RAF
- No. 3 Group Training Flight RAF
- No. 22 Heavy Glider Maintenance Section RAF
- No. 54 Maintenance Unit RAF
- No. 1483 (Bomber) Gunnery Flight RAF, later also Target Towing
- No. 1504 (Beam Approach Training) Flight RAF
- No. 1688 (Bomber) Defence Training Flight RAF
- Air Bomber Training Flight RAF (No. 3 Group)
- Airborne Forces Experimental Establishment
- Night Vision Training School RAF
- Radar Training Flight RAF
