= Sidney Wallingford =

British-born New Zealand aviator and military leader (1898–1978)

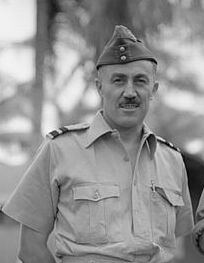
- Born: 12 July 1898; Hythe, Kent, England
- Died: 25 July 1978 (aged 80); Opito Bay, New Zealand
- Relatives: Jesse Wallingford (father)
- Military career
- Allegiance: New Zealand
- Branch: British Army (1916–1918); Royal Air Force (1918–1920; 1924–1929); Royal New Zealand Air Force (1929–1954)
- Rank: Air Commodore
- Commands: RNZAF Northern Group; No. 1 (Islands) Group
- Conflicts: First World War; Salonika campaign; Sinai and Palestine campaign; Second World War; South Pacific campaign
- Awards: Companion of the Order of the Bath; Commander of the Order of the British Empire; Legion of Merit (United States)

Air Commodore Sidney Wallingford, CB, CBE (12 July 1898 – 25 July 1978) was a British-born New Zealand aviator and senior officer in the Royal New Zealand Air Force (RNZAF) during the Second World War.

Born in Hythe, England, Wallingford's family moved to New Zealand in 1911. Working as a seaman after completing his schooling, he returned to England soon after the First World War began and joined the British Army. In 1918, he transferred to the Royal Flying Corps, soon to become the Royal Air Force (RAF) and flew with No. 142 Squadron in the final weeks of the war. He remained in the RAF until 1920 when he returned to New Zealand. He was a policeman in Fiji for a time before rejoining the RAF in 1924. Five years later his service ended and he subsequently joined the New Zealand Permanent Air Force, the predecessor to the RNZAF.

During the early stages of the Second World War, he served in the United Kingdom at the Air Ministry before returning to New Zealand and proceeding to the South Pacific. A liaison officer with the United States forces in 1942, he later commanded No. 1 (Islands) Group, based in Vanuatu and responsible for all RNZAF units in the South Pacific. After the war, he held a series of administrative and staff posts in the RNZAF. Appointed a Companion of the Order of the Bath in 1951, he retired from the RNZAF three years later. He died in 1978, aged 80.

== Early life ==
Sidney Wallingford was born on 12 July 1898 in Hythe, in the county of Kent, England. His father, Jesse Wallingford, was an officer in the British Army but transferred to the New Zealand Military Forces in 1911. The Wallingford family moved to New Zealand and settled in Auckland. Educated at Auckland Grammar School, on completing his schooling, Wallingford worked as a seaman on merchant ships.

In July 1916, Wallingford, by this time back in England, joined the British Army and was posted to the Artist Rifles Regiment. He subsequently served with the 4th Battalion of the Rifle Brigade in the Salonika campaign. In 1918, he transferred to the Royal Flying Corps, soon to become the Royal Air Force (RAF). His flying training completed, he served with No. 142 Squadron during the final stages of the Sinai and Palestine campaign.

== Interwar period ==
Wallingford was discharged from the RAF in January 1920, and he returned to New Zealand. The following year he joined Fiji's police force but only served as a law enforcement officer for a little over 12 months before joining the New Zealand Territorial Air Force (TAF) in June 1923. He was one of the first 72 officers to serve in the TAF. After 12 months, he returned to the United Kingdom and rejoined the RAF on a short service commission as a flying officer. With the RAF, he was twice its shooting champion and also represented the service in the shooting contest at Bisley, winning the Queen Mary Prize on one occasion. Upon completion of his service, in 1929, Wallingford was placed on the reserve.

== Service in New Zealand ==
Returning to New Zealand in June 1929, Wallingford joined the New Zealand Permanent Air Force (NZPAF); this was the predecessor of what in 1934 became the Royal New Zealand Air Force (RNZAF). He initially held the rank of captain; the NZPAF was using army ranks at the time he joined. A few months later, on 12 September, he married Kathleen Jamieson at St Mary's Cathedral in Auckland. In December, the NZPAF adopted the usage of RAF ranks, and Wallingford became a flight lieutenant.

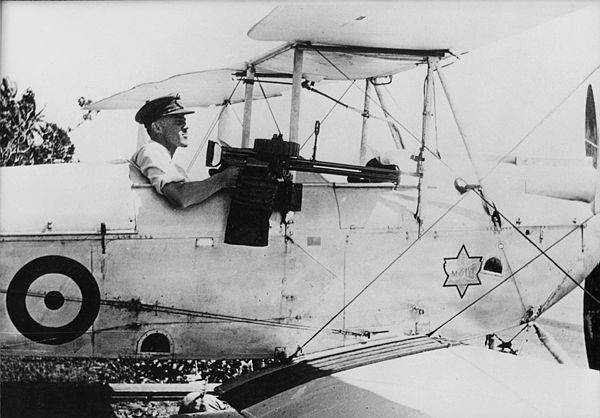
Wallingford in the cockpit of the Gipsy Moth flown in Samoa during the 1930 civil unrest there

Wallingford's initial duties in the NZPAF were as the adjutant at Hobsonville Air Base, where he was initially one of just five personnel. However, in January 1930, he departed New Zealand aboard HMS Dunedin on what would the first and only operational deployment of the NZPAF. The ship's destination was Western Samoa, a mandate of New Zealand. Samoa was experiencing unrest at the time due to the activities of the Mau movement against the New Zealand administration. Aboard Dunedin was a de Havilland Gipsy Moth two–seat trainer aircraft modified as a seaplane. Wallingford flew these on a number of sorties over Samoa, seeking to identify Mau activists and dropping propaganda leaflets. He was provided with only a flare gun, meant for use for signalling for attention in the event of a forced landing, but used this against a hostile villager throwing stones at his slow and low-flying Gipsy Moth. He set fire to a nearby hut in retaliation. The aircraft was later modified to include a Lewis gun. The NZPAF's campaign against the Mau ended in March, with Wallingford having flown over 90 hours.

Later, back in New Zealand, Wallingford often flew rescue missions, looking for missing shipping and performing mercy flights. One of these involved transporting a doctor to Great Barrier Island to carry out emergency surgery on a local. Another was the rescue of a woman from near drowning after being swept out to sea off the west coast of Auckland. He was also involved in an aircraft accident; in October 1930, the Fairey IIIF seaplane that he was piloting crashed upon landing. He and the two passengers were unhurt. The state of the NZPAF throughout the 1930s was a state of concern; it was poorly equipped and resourced and Wallingford authored reports advising that little could be expected of it in the event of hostilities.

In 1936, Wallingford was sent to England to attend the RAF Staff College at Andover. He was subsequently appointed the RNZAF's air liaison officer at the Air Ministry in London in 1938. During his final months in the position by which time he held the rank of squadron leader, he was a co-author, along with Dr. Ernest Marsden, of a report for the New Zealand government on the use of radar for air defence.

== Second World War ==
Returning to New Zealand in 1941, Wallingford was appointed the Member for Personnel on the Air Board, which was responsible for the implementation of the air policies of the New Zealand government. In this capacity he oversaw the rapid expansion in manpower of the RNZAF. In October the following year he was promoted to group captain and was sent to the headquarters of Rear Admiral John S. McCain Sr., the commander of aircraft in the South Pacific, as a liaison officer for the RNZAF. At the time, it had two squadrons, No. 3 and No. 9, operating in the area and he coordinated their operations with those of the Americans. He initially served aboard the USS Curtiss, anchored off Espiritu Santo in Vanuatu but later established a headquarters on the island itself. His work with the United States military was later recognised with an award of the Legion of Merit.

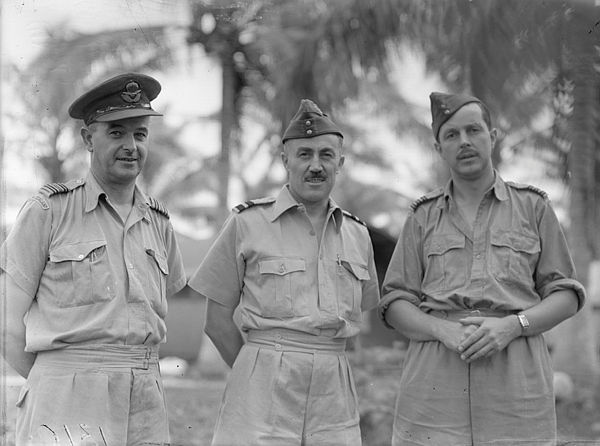
Wallingford, centre, with two of his senior staff at No. 1 (Islands) Group, Squadron Leader J. Stevenson, left, and Wing Commander Ian Morrison

The RNZAF, which had grown its commitment to the military operations in the South Pacific significantly over the preceding year, established No. 1 (Islands) Group on Espiritu Santo in March 1943. Wallingford was appointed its commander and oversaw the administrative work involved in keeping the various RNZAF units running with supplies, equipment and personnel. Promoted to air commodore in April, he was the senior RNZAF officer in the Pacific. In November Wallingford relinquished command of the group and returned to New Zealand where he took up command of the headquarters of the RNZAF Northern Group for a time. He was subsequently appointed a Commander of the Order of the British Empire in "recognition of conspicuous service in operations against the Japanese".

== Postwar service ==
Wallingford was brought back to the Air Board in 1945, as the Member for Supply, serving in this capacity until 1946. The following year he attended the Imperial Defence College and then returned to the Air Board as Member for Personnel. In the 1951 New Year Honours, Wallingford was appointed a Companion of the Order of the Bath. This recognition was unusual in that it was normally limited to RNZAF officers who had served as the Chief of Air Staff and thus held a higher rank than Wallingford, who was still an air commodore. In early 1952, Wallingford commanded a task force headquartered at Clark House in Hobsonville that was tasked with preparing for the deployment of RNZAF units in the event of hostilities.

== Later life ==
Wallingford ended his career in the RNZAF in 1954, retiring with his wife to Rotorua. His final years were spent at Opito Bay, near Whitianga. He died there on 25 July 1978.

A street in Hobsonville, in Auckland, is named for him. His son was also in the RNZAF, serving in the Vietnam War and commanding No. 14 Squadron.
