= Malcolm Calder =

New Zealand aviator and military leader (1907–1978)

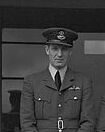
- Calder, 17 August 1941
- Born: 28 August 1907; Temuka, New Zealand
- Died: 31 August 1978 (aged 71); Lower Hutt, New Zealand
- Military career
- Allegiance: New Zealand
- Branch: Royal Air Force; Royal New Zealand Air Force
- Service years: 1931–1939 (RAF); 1939–1962 (RNZAF)
- Rank: Air Vice-Marshal
- Commands: Chief of the Air Staff
- Conflicts: Second World War; Malayan Emergency
- Awards: Companion of the Order of the Bath; Commander of the Order of the British Empire

Malcolm Frederick Calder CB, CBE (28 August 1907 – 31 August 1978) was a New Zealand aviator and military leader who served with the Royal New Zealand Air Force (RNZAF) during the Second World War and in the postwar period.

Born in Temuka, Calder joined the Royal Air Force in 1931, serving until 1939, at which time he transferred to the RNZAF. He was involved in training duties for the early phase of the Second World War and spent the final 18 months of the conflict as a staff officer. Recognised for his war services by being made a Commander of the Order of the British Empire, he oversaw the demobilisation of the RNZAF after the war. In his later career, he held a series of staff postings and commands of RNZAF stations. Appointed a Companion of the Order of the Bath in November 1957, he became Chief of the Air Staff the following year. Retiring as an air vice-marshal in July 1962, he died in 1978 at the age of 71.

== Early life ==
Malcolm Frederick Calder was born in Temuka, New Zealand, on 28 August 1907. He was educated at Christchurch Boys' High School before going onto study law at the University of Canterbury. After graduating he worked for a legal firm for five years and then went to the United Kingdom where he joined the Royal Air Force (RAF) in 1931 on a short service commission as a pilot officer. He trained as a pilot and served with the RAF in the United Kingdom and the Middle East.

On 11 July 1935, Calder married Peggy Mandeno, from Dunedin, at St Luke's Church in Whyteleafe, Surrey. The couple went on to have two children. By late 1938, Calder held the rank of squadron leader. He left the RAF in May 1939 on a transfer to the Royal New Zealand Air Force (RNZAF).

Calder joined the RNZAF in his existing squadron leader rank and was appointed the chief flying instructor at Wigram. With the increased risk of hostilities in Europe, the RNZAF had moved to improve its training capacity. Calder spent July and August visiting various flying clubs around the country, testing their instructors. As a result, many underwent refresher training.

== Second World War ==
For the first 18 months of the Second World War, Calder remained at Wigram, where No. 1 Flying Training School had been established, in his instructing role. Then, in July 1941, and now in the rank of wing commander, he was appointed commander of the RNZAF station at Ohakea. At the start of the following year he became the Air Department's director of training. Promoted to group captain, from March 1943 until 1944 he was commander of RNZAF forces in Fiji. He then served in the Air Department as director of postings and personal services before being appointed to the Air Board as Air Member for Personnel. In the latter role he oversaw the demobilisation of the RNZAF as it reduced its presence in the South Pacific after the end of the Second World War.

== Post-war period ==
In the 1947 New Year Honours, Calder was appointed Commander of the Order of the British Empire. This was in recognition of the services to the RNZAF during the war years. After attending the Imperial Defence College in London in 1948, he was then given command of the RNZAF base at Whenuapai. After four years there, he returned to Wellington where he was on the Air Board with responsibility for personnel. In 1955 he was commander of the headquarters of the RNZAF in London and followed this the next year with a period of service as the senior air staff officer at No. 224 Group in Singapore. The RNZAF had a presence there as No. 14 Squadron was involved in the Malayan Emergency with its de Havilland Venom jet fighters. In recognition of his services in Malaya, Calder was made a Companion of the Order of the Bath. On his return to New Zealand in late 1957, he became assistant chief of the Air Staff. He served in this capacity until July 1958 when he succeeded Air Vice-Marshal Cyrus Kay as Chief of the Air Staff (CAS).

=== Chief of the Air Staff ===
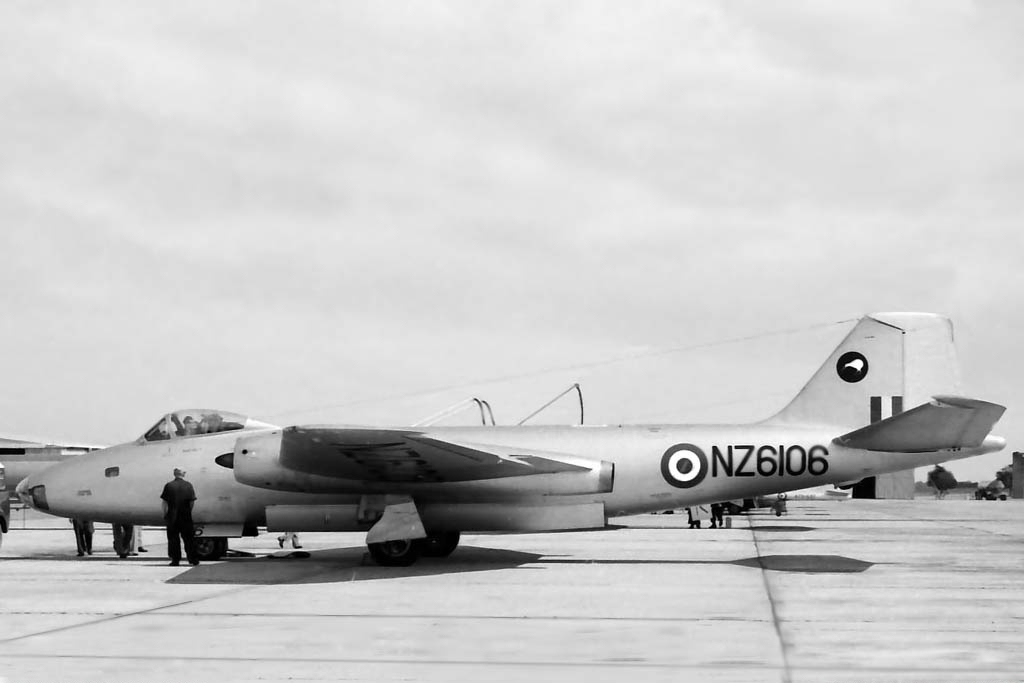
The English Electric Canberra jet bomber entered service with the RNZAF during Calder's tenure as Chief of the Air Staff

As CAS, Calder oversaw the introduction into service of the English Electric Canberra jet bomber which equipped No. 14 Squadron. Morale in the RNZAF dwindled over the final months of Calder's tenure; much of its aircraft were dated, personnel numbers had decreased and the service's budget had been reduced. The situation was not helped by the New Zealand Government's decision in 1961 to prioritise expenditure on the army rather than purchase more Canberras, which Calder had been agitating for. Calder retired from the RNZAF as an air-vice marshal on 1 July 1962. He was succeeded as CAS by Air Vice-Marshal Ian Morrison.

== Later life ==
Calder died on 31 August 1978 at Lower Hutt and was buried in Makara Cemetery. His wife died in 1989. Calder's autobiography, Down to Earth, was published in 2023 by his daughter.

== Notes ==
Military offices
Preceded by Cyrus Kay	Chief of the Air Staff (RNZAF); 1958–1962	Succeeded by Ian Morrison
