= No. 1 (Islands) Group RNZAF =

Royal New Zealand Air Force unit during World War 2

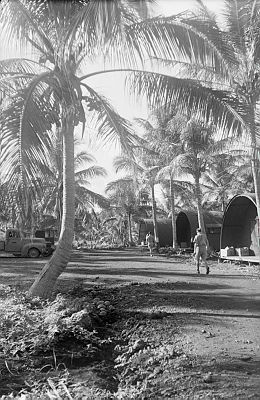
- View of No. 1 (Islands) Group headquarters at Espiritu Santo, July 1943
- Active: 1943–1945
- Country: New Zealand
- Branch: Royal New Zealand Air Force
- Role: Administration and supply
- Engagements: Second World War: Solomon Islands campaign

Commanders
- Notable commanders: Sidney Wallingford; Maurice Buckley; Robert Clark-Hall

No. 1 (Islands) Group RNZAF was a formation of the Royal New Zealand Air Force (RNZAF) which existed from 1943 to 1945, during the Second World War. It was responsible for the administration and supply of the various RNZAF units operating across the South Pacific theatre of operations. At its peak, it was responsible for over 5,000 RNZAF personnel.

== Background ==
Following the outbreak of the Second World War in the Pacific in December 1941, the Allies agreed that the United States would have primary responsibility for the region, which was divided into four areas. The United States Navy was responsible for the South Pacific Area, which extended from New Zealand northwards to the equator and was the region in which the RNZAF was to operate.

Initially the RNZAF flew from bases in Fiji and the New Hebrides (now Vanuatu) but in November 1942, the campaign in the Solomon Islands became its focus. This began with the relocation of No. 3 Squadron from Espiritu Santo to Guadalcanal and it commenced operations from Henderson airfield with its Lockheed Hudson light bombers. Since the RNZAF was subordinate to the American 'Commander, Air, South Pacific' (COMAIRSOPAC), its units were charged with supporting the combat operations of the United States in the Solomons. Group Captain Sidney Wallingford, the senior RNZAF officer in the South Pacific, was a liaison officer to COMAIRSOPAC, Rear Admiral John S. McCain Sr., aboard the latter's flagship, USS Curtiss, anchored off Espiritu Santo.

The administration and supply of the RNZAF units in the South Pacific Area was initially handled by the Air Department in Wellington, New Zealand. However, the RNZAF steadily grew its commitment in the region and soon a number of fighter and bomber squadrons were based in a variety of locations, stretching from New Caledonia to Guadalcanal. In many instances, flying and ground crew personnel were stationed some distance from their administrative elements, with the latter sometimes on different islands entirely. This greatly complicated provision of these units from New Zealand.

== Formation ==
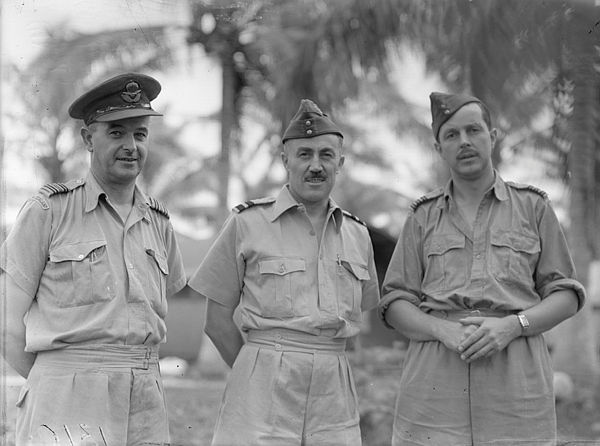
Senior officers of No. 1 (Islands) Group (left to right): Squadron Leader J. Stevenson, Air Commodore Sidney Wallingford, and Wing Commander Ian Morrison

For better control of the supply situation, No. 1 (Islands) Group, with Wallingford as commander, was established on Espiritu Santo on 10 March 1943 for the purpose of keeping the various RNZAF units running with supplies, equipment and personnel. Although it was still subordinate to COMAIRSOPAC, and the individual RNZAF squadrons took orders from local American commanders, Wallingford was able to influence their deployment.

An early problem to be dealt with was finding accommodation for the increasing number of personnel and units in the area and soon a dedicated camp construction squadron was established and controlled by the group. Another issue was supplies; soon the RNZAF units in the field were integrated into the American supply chain, coordinated by No. 1 (Islands) Group. By November, a Base Depot had been established at Espiritu Santo and this took much of the administrative functions from the headquarters of No. 1 (Islands) Group. The group's headquarters was organised to be more mobile, so that it could be closer to the frontline units of the RNZAF although it remained at Espiritu Santo for the time being since it also needed to be in proximity to the headquarters of COMAIRSOPAC. At the end of the month, Wallingford was succeeded by Air Commodore Maurice Buckley.

== South Pacific operations ==
Due to the advance of the American ground forces north through the Solomon Islands, the group's headquarters was relocated to Guadalcanal in January 1944. From here it administrated the various RNZAF units deployed from Fiji through to the Bismarck Archipelago. To service the units north of Guadalcanal, No. 1 (Islands) Group controlled a fleet of Douglas Dakota and Lockheed Hudson transport aircraft. The RNZAF was continuing to expand, and by February No. 1 (Islands) Group was responsible for three fighter squadrons, three bomber squadrons, a dive bomber squadron, a torpedo bomber squadron, and a flying boat squadron. This was in addition to various service and maintenance units. Over 5,100 RNZAF personnel were serving in the region by this time. To control the various squadrons, the New Zealand Air Task Force was established later in the year although responsibility for administration and supplies continued to rest with No. 1 (Islands) Group.

Operationally in the final two years of the war, the duties of the RNZAF units primarily focused on support of the ground forces; with the fighter squadrons no longer required to protect bombers due to the non-existent aerial threat presented by Japanese aircraft, they switched to a fighter-bomber role and supported Australian forces operating on Bougainville Island. The bomber units meanwhile attacked the Japanese positions on New Britain and New Ireland, which had been cut off by the Allied advance.

Once the American ground forces moved beyond the Solomon Islands, the RNZAF squadrons continued to harass the Japanese bases in the region. In August 1945, with the campaign in the South Pacific now at an end, No. 1 (Islands) Group was disbanded. Its final commander was Air Commodore Robert Clark-Hall. The administrative function of the group was transferred to the RNZAF station on Guadalcanal.
