= Fraser Barron =

New Zealand Air Force pilot

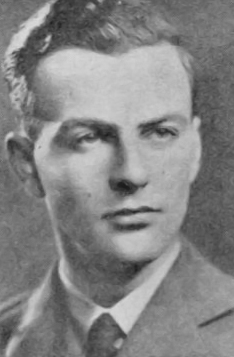
- Born: James Fraser Barron; 9 January 1921; Dunedin, New Zealand
- Died: 20 May 1944 (aged 23); Le Mans, France
- Military career
- Allegiance: New Zealand
- Branch: Royal New Zealand Air Force
- Service years: 1940 – 1944
- Rank: Wing commander
- Units: No. 7 Squadron RAF; No. 15 Squadron RAF
- Commands: No. 7 Squadron RAF
- Conflicts: World War II
- Awards: Distinguished Service Order & Bar; Distinguished Flying Cross; Distinguished Flying Medal

Fraser Barron DSO & Bar, DFC, DFM (9 January 1921 – 20 May 1944), was an officer of the Royal New Zealand Air Force (RNZAF) who flew as a pilot with Bomber Command and was killed in flying operations during World War II.

Born in Dunedin, Barron was working as a clerk when the Second World War began. He volunteered for the RNZAF and qualified as a pilot in late 1940. He went to England as a sergeant to serve with the Royal Air Force and after training on heavy bombers was posted to No. 15 Squadron, flying Short Stirling bombers. He completed a first tour of operations by April 1942, flying 39 missions, after which he performed instructing duties. He commenced a second tour in September 1942, this time with No. 7 Squadron, part of the Pathfinder Force, flying numerous missions to mark targets for following bombers. Already a recipient of the Distinguished Flying Medal, awarded during his first tour, he was awarded the Distinguished Flying Cross and then, at the conclusion of his second tour, the Distinguished Service Order (DSO). By now having reached the rank of squadron leader, another period as an instructor followed. He soon desired a return to operations and arranged to be posted back to No. 7 Squadron. Now flying Avro Lancaster bombers, he flew on several more missions until he was killed on 20 May 1944, when his aircraft and its crew crashed at Le Mans. He was posthumously awarded a bar to his DSO, one of only four personnel of the RNZAF to receive this honour during the Second World War.

== Early life ==
James Fraser Barron, known as Fraser Barron, was born on 9 January 1921 in Dunedin, New Zealand, one of two children of James Barron and his wife Winifred née Fraser. His father was a grocer and when Barron was a child, purchased a store at Maheno, near Oamaru. He was educated at the local primary school and then went onto Waitaki Boys' High School. He participated in several sports while at school but otherwise was an average student. He was also interested in aviation; he was one of many boys who had a ride with Charles Kingsford Smith as the Southern Cross, a Fokker F.VIIb/3m trimotor monoplane, toured New Zealand in 1933. He also wrote aviation-themed stories for the school magazine. Completing his education at the end of 1937, he moved to Wellington, where he worked as a cadet clerk in the Mines Department.

== Second World War ==
Shortly after the outbreak of the Second World War, Barron applied to join the Royal New Zealand Air Force (RNZAF). His application was duly accepted and as a leading aircraftman, he underwent a short-term training course beginning on 2 July 1940, which would determine whether he would be selected for training as a pilot, observer or air gunner. Shortly before commencing the course, he was offered the opportunity to train with the Fleet Air Arm, provided he leave for England the following month. As he was still only 18, he required his parents' consent to go overseas but this was not given. Instead, Barron proceeded with the RNZAF course.

After the initial course, held at RNZAF Levin, was completed, at the end of July Barron was selected for pilot training and proceeded to RNZAF Taieri, near Dunedin. Learning to fly on De Havilland Tiger Moth trainer aircraft, one of his fellow trainees at Taieri's No. 1 Elementary Flying Training School was James Ward, who would the following year be awarded the Victoria Cross. Barron soloed on 9 August and at the end of the following month was receiving training on Fairey Gordons at Wigram airbase. He qualified as a pilot on 12 December and the following month, upon graduation from flight training, was promoted to sergeant. He departed for England on the passenger ship Aorangi on 29 January 1941.

After stops in Fiji and Canada, Barron arrived in England on 5 March 1941. He, along with Ward, was selected for training on heavy bombers and posted to the Royal Air Force's 20 Bomber Operational Training Unit (OTU), in Scotland. Here he spent several weeks learning to fly the two-engined Vickers Wellington medium bomber, at one stage surviving a ditching in the North Sea when an engine failed during a night-time navigation exercise. He finished his training in mid-June 1941.

== On active service ==
After leaving 20 OTC, Barron was posted to No. 15 Squadron, which was stationed at RAF Wyton, north of London, and operated flying Short Stirling heavy bombers. The Stirling was the first four-engined bomber to enter service with the Royal Air Force. Not being familiar with the aircraft, Barron had to undergo a series of conversion flights before embarking on his first operation, a bombing raid on Germany on the night of 7/8 July. As in his next nine missions, Barron flew as second pilot to a more experienced captain. One of these flights was a low-level solo raid on railway yards in Bielefeld, in Germany.

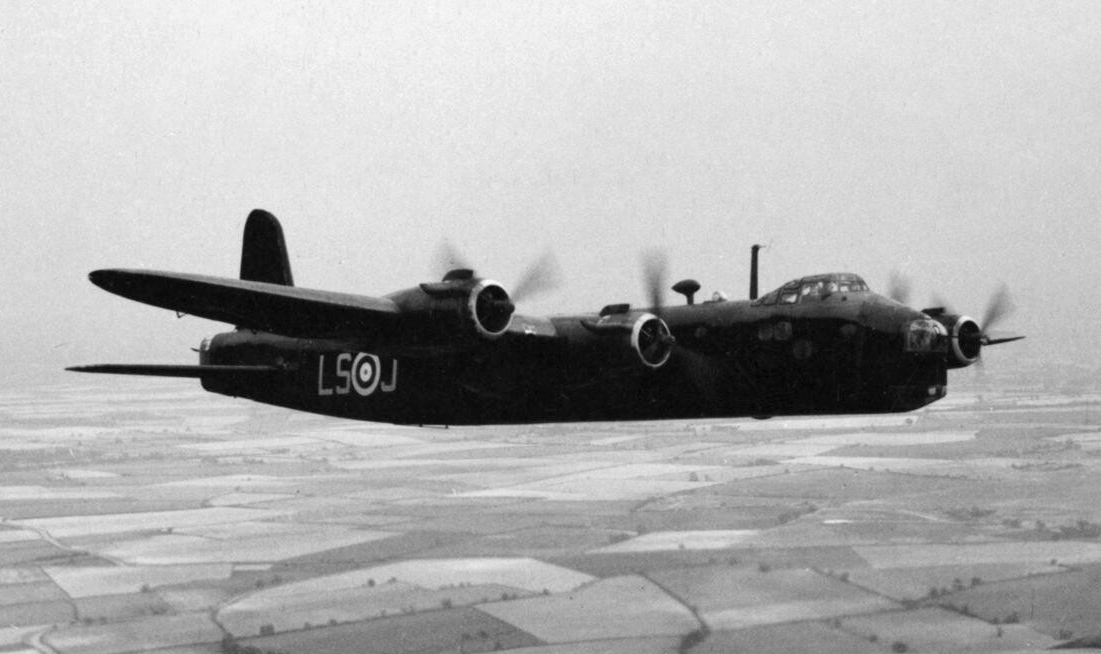
A Short Stirling of No. 15 Squadron

Barron was given his own crew and aircraft on 1 September 1941 and received a promotion to flight sergeant. His first mission as captain took place two days later, an attack on the port at Brest in north-west France. However, he had to jettison his bombs so he could evade a German night fighter. Several more missions, including some targeting the German battleships Scharnhorst and Gneisenau, which were at Brest for repairs, followed. He also spent a period as an instructor, doing night landings and cross-country flights with trainee pilots.

By the end of April 1942, Barron had completed 39 missions, 29 as aircraft captain, and finished his first tour. Now a pilot officer, having been promoted earlier in the year, he was awarded the Distinguished Flying Medal (DFM) the following month, the citation noting that Barron was "most reliable, efficient and courageous, pressing home his attacks regardless of opposition." It was typical for aircrew that had completed a tour to be rested and perform instructing duties for a time. In Barron's case, he was posted to No. 1651 Conversion Unit, stationed at Waterbeach, as an instructor. After a period of leave, he arrived at Waterbeach on 21 May but within a week was called back to No. 15 Squadron to fly in the 1,000-bomber raid on Cologne. Prior to the raid, he carried out a minelaying mission to the Frisian Islands; he described the operation as being "to get his hand in again." After the Cologne mission, flown on the night of 30/31 May, Barron participated in the followup large scale bombing raid on Essen, two nights later. He then returned to Waterbeach to pick up his instructing duties, which he soon began to find dull, despite being involved in four more bombing missions involving significant numbers of aircraft.

== Flying as a Pathfinder ==
At the end of his instructing tour, in September 1942, Barron volunteered for operational flying and was posted to No. 7 Squadron, which operated Stirlings and flew from Oakington, in Cambridgeshire. His new unit was one of the founding squadrons of the Pathfinder Force, considered to be the elite of Bomber Command and tasked with locating and marking targets as the vanguard to the main bombing raid that would follow. Qualified pathfinder flying personnel benefited from quick promotions and were entitled to wear a distinctive Pathfinder Force badge. Barron started flying missions for the squadron on 2 October and shortly afterwards was promoted to flight lieutenant; his promotion saw him skip the intervening rank of flying officer. On one early mission with No. 7 Squadron, his aircraft was attacked, in separate incidents, by night fighters. After his 50th mission, a raid on 7 November that targeted Genoa in Italy, Barron traveled to Buckingham Palace, to be presented with the DFM by King George VI. Shortly afterwards, he qualified to wear the Pathfinder badge.

Barron continued to fly pathfinder missions; notable raids included an attack on Turin on 11/12 December, where his aircraft was the only one of three from No. 7 Squadron to bomb the target and successfully return, and a raid on Munich on 21 December, where his Stirling was attacked by a night fighter but thanks to the efforts of his flight engineer, Barron was able to fly his badly damaged bomber back to England. By February 1943, Barron and his crew were trained in the use of the new H2S radar, initially provided to the Pathfinder Force, and used it for the first time in action on the night of 2/3 February in a mission to bomb Cologne. It proved to be a notable action for Barron; over Cologne, he was targeted by over 30 searchlights for 15 minutes and subjected to a severe barrage of flak. Despite this he ensured his bombs were dropped on target, was able to evade the searchlights, and made it back to England with a damaged aircraft. He later wrote of the event, "I really thought they had me that night." The following night, Fraser and his crew flew a raid to Hamburg. One engine of his Stirling was shot away over the city and on the return flight to England, a storm caused ice to form on the fuselage and wings. With only three engines, the aircraft gradually lost height due to the ice. As they crossed Holland, the crew discarded ammunition and weapons to help lighten the Stirling. Fortunately, the ice began to melt, and Barron was able to gain sufficient height to clear the channel and safely land.

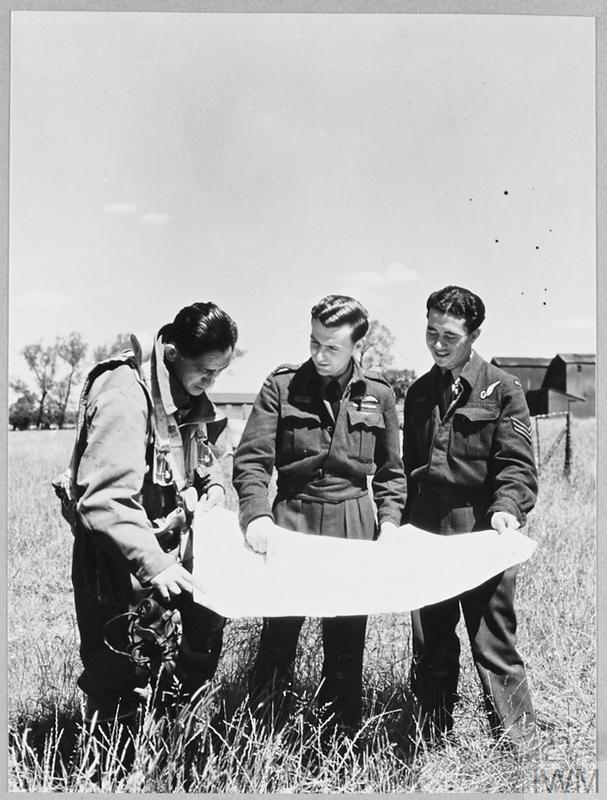
Squadron Leader Fraser Barron (centre) with Māori flying personnel from New Zealand, June 1943

A few days after the dramatic Cologne mission, Barron was awarded the Distinguished Flying Cross (DFC) for his "courage and skill, together with determination to strike at the enemy on every possible occasion and with the greatest destructive effect." His second tour ended on 2 March 1943, when he was taken off operations having completed 22 missions. The same day, he was awarded the Distinguished Service Order (DSO), in relation to his 2 February raid on Cologne. Barron was the first New Zealander to have been awarded the DFM, the DFC, and the DSO and his feat was widely reported in his home country. The citation for his DSO, published in the London Gazette, read:

"One night in February, 1943, this officer [Barron] was the captain of an aircraft detailed to attack Cologne. When nearing the target area his aircraft was held in a cone of searchlights and subjected to heavy fire from the ground defences. Despite this, Flight Lieutenant Barron remained on his course, defying an intense and concentrated barrage, and pressed home a successful attack on his second run over the target. This officer displayed exceptional gallantry and devotion to duty, setting an example of the highest order."

— The London Gazette, No. 35927, 2 March 1943

With his second tour over, Barron went on leave for a few weeks before taking an instructor's course in preparation for his next posting, at No. 11 OTU at RAF Westcott in Buckinghamshire. By the time he arrived at Westcott in mid-March to take up his instructing position, he had been promoted to squadron leader. His new role required cross-country flights and nighttime flying of Wellington bombers which kept him busy. In late May, he returned to Buckingham Palace to be presented with his DFC and DSO and dined with the High Commissioner of New Zealand, Bill Jordan. As a highly decorated pilot, he was often involved in propaganda and recruitment drives and in June was photographed with Māori flying personnel from New Zealand who were undergoing training at 11 OTU.

Tiring of the training environment, Barron hankered for a return to active duty; in letters he told his family he was exerting pressure on senior officers in the Pathfinder Force for his return to operations. He was eventually successful in his efforts and after Christmas 1943, he rejoined the now Lancaster-equipped No. 7 Squadron for a third tour. It was intended that this tour would be limited to 20 missions, by the end of which he would have flown 81 operational flights. By this time, he was dating Marie, a member of the Women's Auxiliary Air Force, who he had met while at Westcott.

The first mission of his third tour was a raid on Brunswick on the night of 14/15 January 1944. Although a quiet mission for Barron, 38 Lancasters, a quarter of which were Pathfinder aircraft, were shot down or lost of the 496 that took part. Several raids, including some on Berlin and the Leipzig raid of 19 February, during which 78 bombers were lost, followed. By this stage, Barron had been promoted to wing commander and was leader of one of the flights of No. 7 Squadron. This rise in rank and extra responsibility was as a result of losses in the squadron from the past few missions. In March, Barron had two periods as acting commander of No. 7 Squadron, the first being due to the nominal commander being on leave and the second because the commander did not return from a raid on Frankfurt. He also participated in a mission to bomb Nuremberg, on the night of 30/31 March. This saw the loss of 96 aircraft and around 750 flying personnel, the most on a single raid for Bomber Command during the war.

By April, the focus of Bomber Command's efforts was shifting to strategic targets in France, such as railways, bases and depots, in support for the forthcoming invasion of Normandy. At the same time, Barron began flying missions as master bomber, which involved him controlling and observing raids. This meant extended flight time over the target. His first such mission, and 75th overall, was a raid on railway marshalling yards at Tergnier involving 171 aircraft, mainly Halifaxes. He concluded the raid a failure. On 28 April, he was again acting commander of No. 7 Squadron, the incumbent, having been in the role for only a month, having been lost on a raid the previous night. On the night of 7/8 May, he flew as master bomber on a raid on an airfield in Nantes, controlling 93 Lancasters. The attack was a success, with later observations noting 250 bomb craters on the airfield, many on the runways.

== Death ==
On the night of 19/20 May 1944, Barron acted as master bomber in an attack on railway yards at Le Mans in France, his 79th operation. He failed to return. Initially reported as missing, he was not declared presumed dead until May the following year. The exact circumstances of Barron's death are unclear, but a collision with another aircraft of No. 7 Squadron, acting as deputy master bomber, is considered the most likely event. It is possible that flak may have been involved. The 15 men on both No. 7 Squadron aircraft were all killed with Barron's Lancaster crashing into a Renault factory, close to the aiming point for the raid. Originally interred in a civilian grave, alongside one of his crew members, Flight Sergeant Derek Wood, Barron was re-interred in the Commonwealth War Graves Commission's Le Mans West Cemetery after the war.

After receiving the news that Barron was missing, a few weeks later his parents received notification of the award of a bar to his DSO. This was for the mission on Nantes carried out on 7/8 May and the citation, published on 13 June, read:

One night in May 1944, this officer participated in an attack on an airfield at Nantes. By his appreciation of the responsibilities entrusted to him and the skill and precision with which he executed his attack, Wing Commander Barron contributed in a large measure to the success achieved. Since being awarded the Distinguished Service Order, this officer has taken part in many attacks on dangerous and difficult targets. He is an outstanding captain whose example of skill, bravery and determination has impressed all.

— The London Gazette, No. 36566, 13 June 1944

On 27 February 1948, his mother received the bar on his behalf from Governor General Sir Bernard Freyberg, in an investiture at Dunedin. A total of 55 personnel from the RNZAF were awarded the DSO during the Second World War. Barron was one of only four, and the only one from Bomber Command, to be awarded a bar to his DSO. In addition to his DSO and bar, DFC and DFM, Barron was also entitled to the 1939–1945 Star, Air Crew Europe Star, the Defence Medal, War Medal 1939–1945 and the New Zealand War Service Medal.

In 2026, on Anzac Day, a plaque, organised by the New Zealand Remembrance Army, in memory of Barron was to be unveiled at the Maheno Memorial Cenotaph in North Otago. Barron had spent his childhood locally but his name was not recorded on the Memorial Cenotaph there as the family connection to Maheno was lost when his parents moved to Palmerston.
