= Maurice Buckley (RNZAF officer) =

New Zealand aviator and military leader (1895–1956)

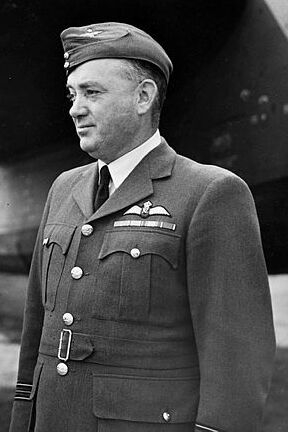
- Born: 3 August 1895; Seacliff, New Zealand
- Died: 3 November 1956 (aged 61); Wellington, New Zealand
- Military career
- Allegiance: New Zealand
- Branch: New Zealand Military Forces; Royal Naval Air Service; Royal New Zealand Air Force
- Service years: 1914–1915 (NZMF); 1915–1920 (RNAS); 1926–1950 (RNZAF)
- Rank: Air Commodore
- Commands: No. 75 Squadron; RAF Feltwell; RNZAF Northern Group; No. 1 (Islands) Group
- Conflicts: First World War; Second World War
- Awards: Commander of the Order of the British Empire; Mentioned in Despatches; Legion of Merit (United States)

Maurice Buckley CBE (3 August 1895 – 3 November 1956) was a New Zealand aviator and military leader who served with the Royal New Zealand Air Force (RNZAF) during the Second World War.

Born in Seacliff in the South Island, Buckley joined the New Zealand Expeditionary Force on the outbreak of the First World War. He served with the Canterbury Mounted Rifles but then transferred to the Royal Naval Air Service in mid-1916. After training as a pilot, he served in the Eastern Mediterranean before taking ill with malaria. After the war he worked in civil aviation in New Zealand until in 1926 he joined what became the RNZAF. On the outbreak of the Second World War in 1939, he was in England in charge of RNZAF personnel tasked with ferrying newly purchased Vickers Wellington medium bombers back to New Zealand. He was appointed commander of No. 75 Squadron leading it until late 1940. He subsequently became the commander at the RAF station at Feltwell. Returning to New Zealand in late 1941, he held a series of local and overseas command and staff posts until his eventual retirement from the RNZAF as an air commodore in 1950. He died in Wellington on 3 November 1956, aged 61.

== Early life ==
Maurice William Buckley was born on 3 August 1895 at Seacliff, New Zealand, one of eight children of a farmer. After completing his education at Timaru Boys' High School, Buckley laboured on the family farm at Fairlie.

== First World War ==
On 3 August 1914, Buckley volunteered for the Canterbury Mounted Rifles, a unit of the New Zealand Expeditionary Force being raised for service in the First World War. However, he was ineligible to serve overseas, being a year younger than the minimum age requirement of 20. In late 1915, he decided to join the Royal Naval Air Service (RNAS) and departed New Zealand for the United Kingdom early the following year. He commenced his flying training at Eastbourne in July and by the end of 1916 had gained his wings. He served with the RNAS in the Eastern Mediterranean for much of 1917, flying bombing sorties against the Turkish forces. He became ill with malaria partway through the year but recovered and subsequently flew on the Bulgarian front.

By the end of 1917 Buckley's health was in decline and he was medically repatriated to New Zealand early the following year to recover. He returned to the United Kingdom in mid-1918 and, having been promoted to captain in what was now the Royal Air Force (RAF), was posted as an instructor at Great Yarmouth. He was discharged from the RAF in May 1920.

== Interwar period ==
Buckley returned to New Zealand where he found employment as a pilot with the Timaru-based New Zealand Air Transport Company. He later worked for the Canterbury Aviation Company and made the first aeroplane flight to Stewart Island, flying a de Havilland there in 1921. He also landed an Avro 504K biplane at Golden Bay, near Nelson, becoming the first pilot to do so. In December, having stunted an aircraft at low level over Timaru and deemed a danger to the public, he was fined 20 shillings. A charge of trick flying, the first time this was raised in New Zealand, was dismissed.

In 1923 Buckley joined the New Zealand Territorial Air Force; he was one of the first 72 officers to join. The next year he formed his own airline, Arrow Aviation. In July 1926 he commenced a full-time career in the military when he joined the New Zealand Permanent Air Force, the predecessor to the Royal New Zealand Air Force (RNZAF). He served as a flying instructor at Wigram Aerodrome and commanded the air base there for a time in 1929 in the absence of its regular commander overseas. By this time he was married to Lykke Smidt, the wedding having taken place at Palmerston North late the previous year. In 1931 he was assigned to No. 2 (Bomber) Squadron as its adjutant and later commanded the airbase at Hobsonville. He was appointed a Member of the Order of the British Empire in the 1935 Birthday Honours. This was in recognition of his services with the military over the previous several years.

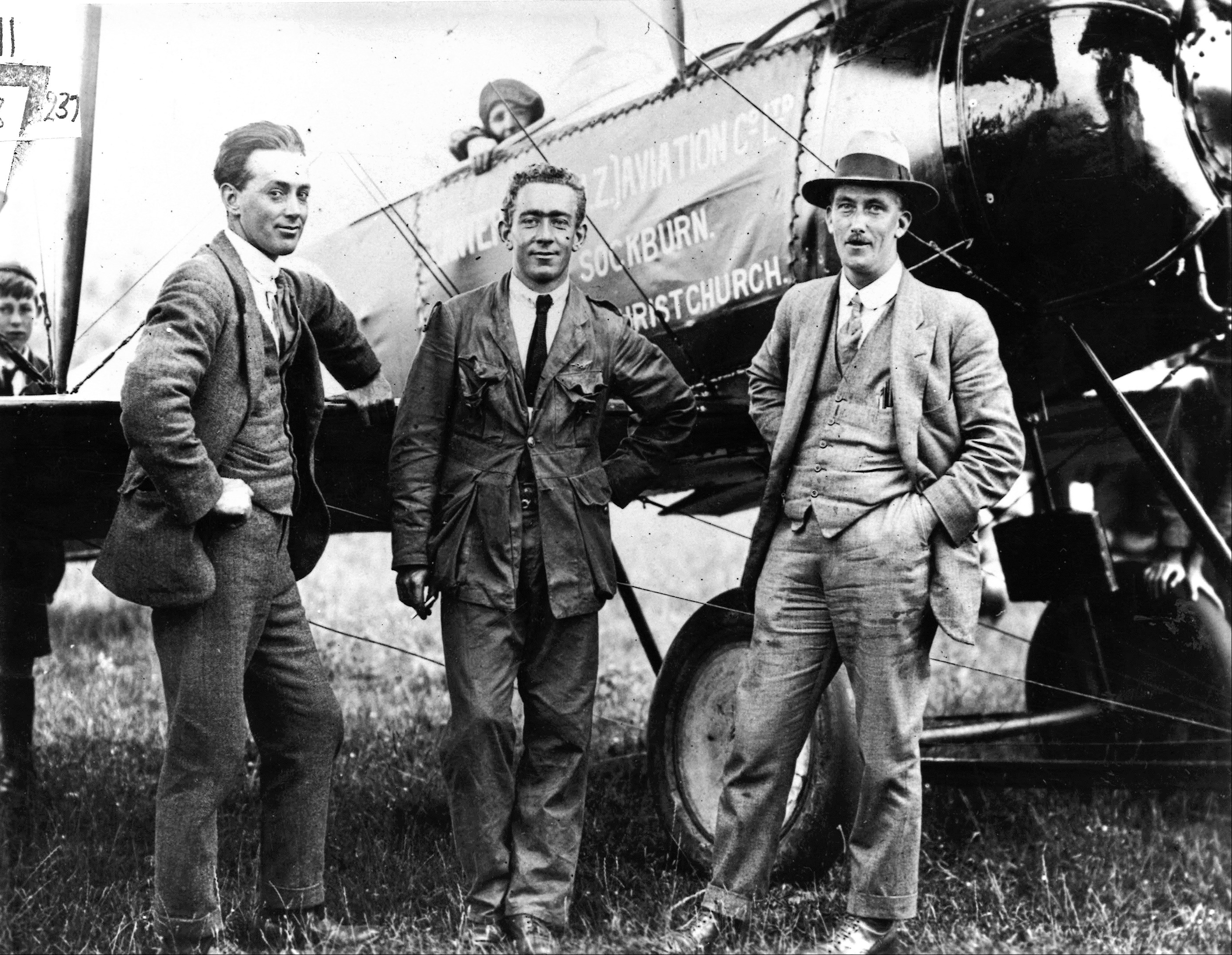
Staff of the Canterbury Aviation Company; Buckley stands on the left

In 1937 Buckley was sent on attachment to England to serve with No. 38 Squadron, equipped with the Vickers Wellington medium bomber and based at Marham. The New Zealand government had purchased 30 Wellingtons for the RNZAF and Buckley, who by this time held the rank of squadron leader, was to gain experience with the type prior to forming a flight of RNZAF personnel to ferry the aircraft back to New Zealand. This flight was established at Marham in June 1939 with Buckley in command and charged with flying training.

== Second World War ==
On the outbreak of the Second World War, the New Zealand government offered its Wellingtons and the RNZAF personnel, still at Marham training for the ferry flight, to the RAF. Initially, the New Zealanders were to be distributed among the existing RAF squadrons but after some deliberation it was decided to keep them together to form the basis of a separate unit having a New Zealand identity within the RAF. In the interim, the RNZAF personnel, which had previously focused on navigation and flying training, now familiarised themselves with gunnery and bombing tactics with a view to taking on operational duties in due course. In April 1940, No. 75 (NZ) Squadron was duly established at Feltwell with Buckley, promoted to wing commander, in command. While its flying personnel were mainly New Zealanders, ground staff were British.

No. 75 Squadron flew in Bomber Command's operations against the Ruhr region of Germany in May, and after the entry of Italy into the war the next month, it was involved in the first attempted bombing raids on that country. It also carried out defensive bombing attacks on targets in Belgium and France as the German invasion of those countries proceeded. For health reasons Buckley was posted to No. 214 Reserve Flight at Stradishall in late November and was succeeded as commander of the squadron by Wing Commander Cyrus Kay. He was mentioned in despatches in the 1941 New Year Honours. In March, Buckley, promoted to group captain, was appointed station commander at Feltwell.

Buckley returned to the service of the RNZAF in November and on return to New Zealand took command of RNZAF station Hobsonville. In 1942 he then was then appointed Air Officer Commanding (AOC), Northern Group RNZAF, which was based at Whenuapai. In late November 1943, Buckley went to Espiritu Santo in the South Pacific to take command of No. 1 (Islands) Group RNZAF. This was tasked with keeping the various RNZAF units, supporting the operations of the United States in the Solomon Islands campaign, deployed in the South Pacific running with supplies, equipment and personnel. He relinquished command in November 1944, returning to New Zealand to take up an appointment as Deputy Chief of Air Staff (DCAS). His service in the South Pacific was subsequently recognised by the Americans with an award of the Legion of Merit.

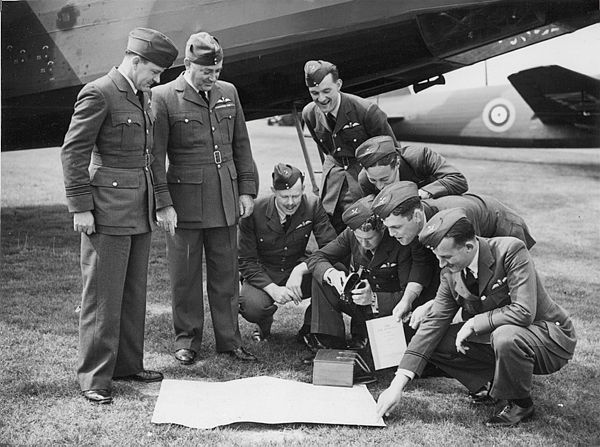
Buckley, standing second left, with Cyrus Kay, his successor as commander of No. 75 (NZ) Squadron, standing first left, and a group of New Zealand pilots studying a map, 1939

== Postwar career ==
His term as DCAS ended in 1946 and Buckley then served as AOC of the RNZAF Headquarters in London. He was appointed a Commander of the Order of the British Empire in the 1946 Birthday Honours. He retired from the RNZAF as an air commodore in 1951. Buckley died in Wellington on 3 November 1956. He was survived by his wife and a son and daughter.

A street in Hobsonville is named for him.
