= No. 75 Squadron RAF =

Defunct flying squadron of the Royal Air Force

No. 75 (New Zealand) Squadron RAF
- Active: 1 October 1916 – 13 June 1919; 15 March 1937 – 4 April 1940; 4 April 1940 – 15 October 1945
- Country: New Zealand
- Allegiance: United Kingdom
- Branch: Royal Air Force
- Nickname: New Zealand
- Mottos: Māori: Ake ake kia kaha ("For ever and ever be strong")

Insignia
- Squadron Badge: In front of two mining hammers in saltire, a hei-tiki
- Squadron Codes: FO Oct 1938 – Sep 1939; AA (Apr 1940 – Oct 1945); JN (Feb 1943 – Oct 1945, 'C' Flt only)

No. 75 Squadron was a unit of the Royal Flying Corps and Royal Air Force in World War I and the RAF in World War II. In 1940–1945, it was a bomber unit composed mainly of New Zealand-born personnel. In October 1945, the squadron number – along with its heraldry and honours – was relinquished by the RAF and transferred to the Royal New Zealand Air Force, officially becoming No. 75 Squadron RNZAF. No other RAF squadron has been gifted in this way, to another Commonwealth air force.

== First World War, Royal Flying Corps, Home Defence Squadron ==
Established as a unit of the Royal Flying Corps for Home Defence, it was formed at Goldington, Bedfordshire on 1 October 1916 with B.E.2c and BE2e aircraft, supplementing these with BE.12s in 1917. The squadron had detachments at Yelling (Cambridgeshire), Old Weston (Huntingdonshire) and Therfield (Hertfordshire). In February 1917, with the threat from German Zeppelin attacks considered to be contained, and an urgent need for night flying qualified pilots to man night bomber squadrons to operate over the Western Front, consideration was given to disbanding 75 and 77 Squadrons, but instead, pilots were detached from several home defence squadrons to form the new 100 Squadron. While the squadron remained operational, it was badly understrength - on 7 March 1917, it had 7 aircraft, and four pilots, compared with an establishment strength of 18 of each. It moved to Elmswell in East Anglia in September 1917, with detachments at Harling Road and Hadleigh. Operational flying against day and night raids proved fruitless and the pilots did not engage the enemy. Late in 1917, the Squadron became part of 50 Southern Wing. Minimal records exist to show that the Squadron flew 16 interception sorties between September 1917 to August 1918. In May 1918 the squadron moved to North Weald tasked with night fighting, and it received Avro 504K and Sopwith Pups in October.

After the war, Sopwith Camels arrived (December) and finally Sopwith Snipes (March 1919). Little information has survived about the squadron's early history, however, John Rawling's Fighter Squadrons of the Royal Air Force confirms that it saw no action before being disbanded, still at North Weald, on 13 June 1919.

== 1937: Reformed as bomber squadron ==
The squadron reformed as No. 75 (Bomber) Squadron on 15 March 1937 as part of a planned expansion of the RAF. It used B Flight, No. 218 Squadron as cadre, forming at RAF Driffield in Yorkshire. Initial aircraft received were four Vickers Virginia night bombers and two Avro Ansons. Later more Ansons arrived from No. 215 Squadron to give six in each flight. By September Handley Page Harrow heavy bombers replaced the Virginias and the squadron became a long-range bomber unit with six aircraft in each flight and four in reserve, with the squadron code of '75' painted on the fuselage. In July 1938 they moved to RAF Honington and were issued with the aircraft code of 'FO' to replace the '75'. By March 1939, 75 Sqn became the Pool for No. 3 Group, RAF Bomber Command, effectively becoming an Operational Training Unit (OTU), it moved to RAF Stradishall in July 1939 and re-equipped with Vickers Wellington Mk1's. On 4 April 1940, 75 Sqn was absorbed into No.6 (Training) Group and ceased to exist. The reformed squadron did not create, adopt or have authorised an official RAF Squadron badge.

== The New Zealand Squadron ==
The New Zealand government ordered 30 Vickers Wellington Mk1C bombers in 1938. RNZAF aircrew were sent to England to train on the new aircraft based at RAF Marham. The crews were to fly the aircraft to New Zealand in batches of six. RAF official records name this group of airman as "The New Zealand Squadron", and as a result of Britain declaring war against Germany, the New Zealand Government made the airman and the aircraft available to the RAF to help with the new war effort. A decision by the British Air Ministry to give them the defunct No. 75 Squadron numberplate on 4 April 1940, meant that the nucleus of The New Zealand Squadron personnel remained together as an operational unit of the RAF.

== Second World War: New Zealand crews ==
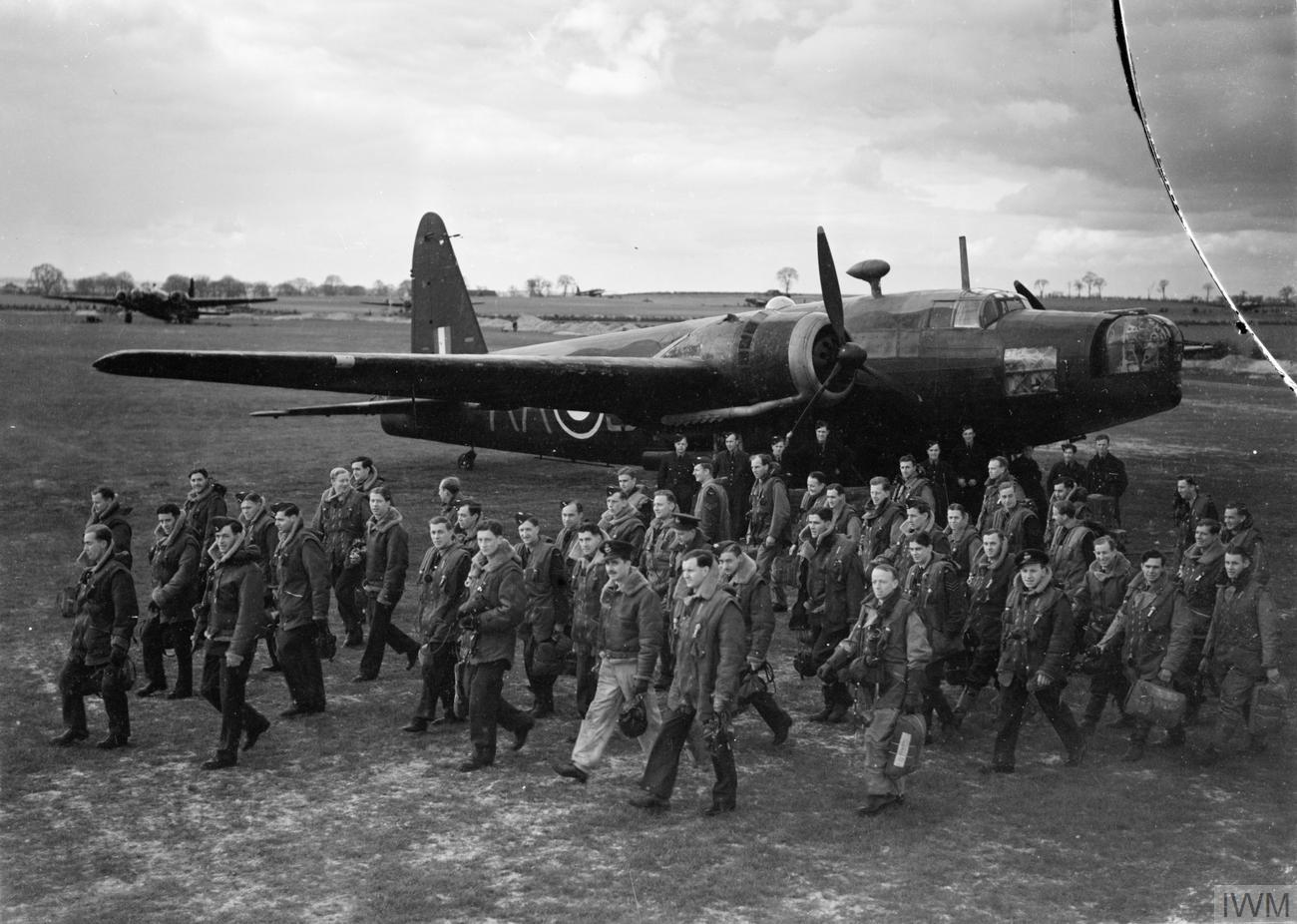
75 Squadron aircrew with a Wellington Mk I in the background at RAF Feltwell before a night raid on Hamburg

On 4 April 1940, The New Zealand Squadron, commanded by Wing Commander Maurice Buckley, was renamed No. 75 Squadron with the letters (NZ) being added in brackets after the number. This was the first Commonwealth squadron to be so created in the Second World War. Although often referred to, then and since, as an RNZAF unit, 75 Squadron was equipped and controlled by the RAF until VJ Day. (This was not the case with most RNZAF units, as well as those from the other Dominions; technically these units were attached to the RAF under Article XV of the Empire Air Training Scheme, and were known as "Article XV squadrons".)

75 (NZ) Sqn rejoined No. 3 Group and was based initially at RAF Feltwell, then RAF Mildenhall, RAF Newmarket and RAF Mepal in Cambridgeshire. It saw action over France, Norway, Belgium, Italy, Sweden and Germany.

Its code letters of "AA" became widely recognised on both sides. The squadron operated with three flights after receiving Short Stirlings, and "C" Flight was given the code letters "JN" as there were insufficient codes for three flights of "AA". Avro Lancasters replaced the Stirlings in 1944 until August 1945 when after moving to RAF Spilsby the squadron began converting to Avro Lincolns as part of the new Tiger Force. The squadron had to leave their well tuned and looked-after Lancasters at Mepal and were given a squadron of rather poorly kept Lancasters at Spilsby. The personnel were now completely New Zealanders, but when Japan surrendered, the squadron had received only three Lincolns to take to the Far East, and it was soon disbanded, with the New Zealanders being slowly shipped home over a twelve-month period.

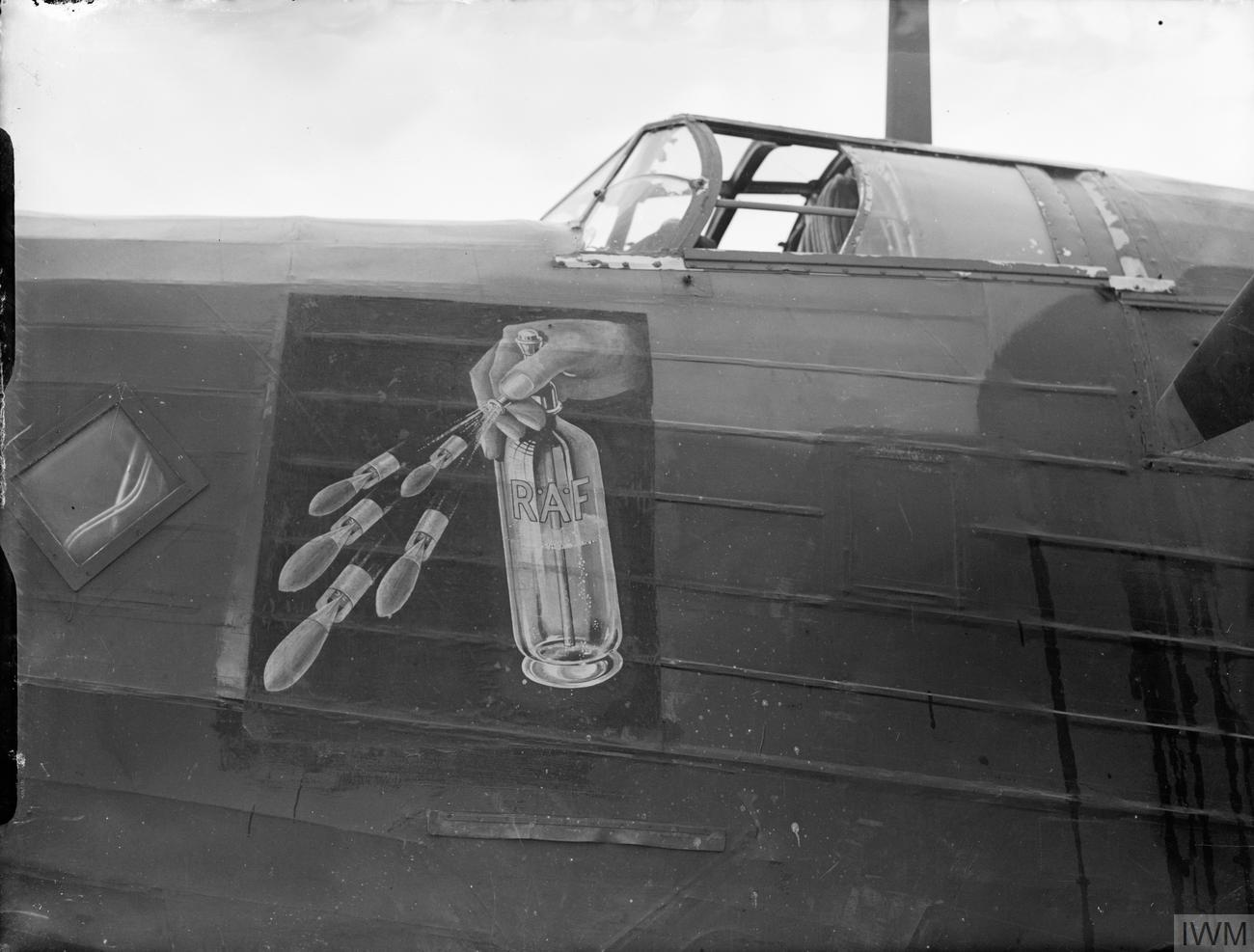
Nose art on a 75 Squadron Wellington at RAF Feltwell This nose art was on R1162: Y for Yorker and was painted by Pilot Officer Edward Thomas Wilcox RAFVR who was the aircraft’s rear gunner at the time.

75 (Bomber) Squadron 1937–1940, and 75 (NZ) Squadron 1940–1945, was based at:

From	To	Name	Equipment
Mar 1937	Jul 1938	RAF Driffield	Anson Mk.I, Virginia Mk.X
Jul 1938	Jul 1939	RAF Honington	Anson Mk.I, Harrow Mks.I, II
Jul 1939	Sep 1939	RAF Stradishall	Anson Mk.I, Wellington Mk.I
Sep 1939	Apr 1940	RAF Harwell	Anson Mk.I, Wellington Mk.I
Apr 1940	Aug 1942	RAF Feltwell	Wellington Mks.I, Ia, Ic
Aug 1942	Nov 1942	RAF Mildenhall	Vickers Wellington Mks.Ia, Ic Short Stirling Mk.I
Nov 1942	Jun 1943	RAF Newmarket	Short Stirling Mk.I
Jun 1943	Jul 1945	RAF Mepal	Short Stirling Mks.I, III Lancaster Mks.I, III
Jul 1945	Oct 1945	RAF Spilsby	Lancaster Mks.I, III Lincoln Mk.II

== Transfer to the Royal New Zealand Air Force ==
In October 1946, in gratitude for the work done and sacrifices made by its New Zealand aircrew, Britain transferred the squadron number, badge and colours to the Royal New Zealand Air Force. No. 2 Squadron RNZAF was disposing of its Ventura bombers at RNZAF Base Ohakea at the time, and so was disbanded and renumbered as No. 75 Squadron RNZAF. It formed up as a Fighter/Bomber unit and re-equipped with 50 ex-RAF de Havilland Mosquitos, which they flew out from Britain.

The RAF were to never again have a No. 75 Squadron, and it is the only RAF Squadron to be given to a Commonwealth country by Britain. The squadron badge was also transferred and maintained its RAF format but with the Royal New Zealand Air Force title. This is also a unique aspect, being the only RAF format badge among all the RNZAF Commonwealth format badges.

== Achievements ==
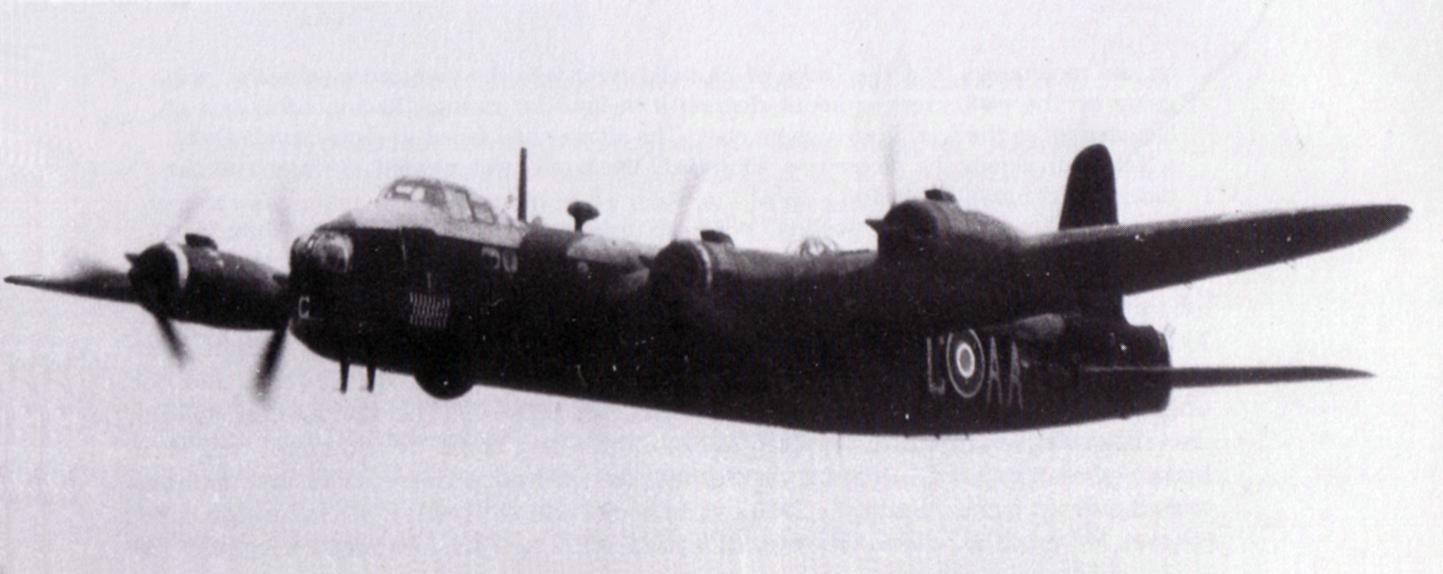
Short Stirling marked with No.75 Squadron code 'AA-C'

75 (NZ) Squadron was engaged constantly against Germany from 1940 to VE day. The squadron flew more sorties than any other heavy bomber squadron in Bomber Command and lost the second most aircraft of Bomber Command. The highest Commonwealth award for valour – the Victoria Cross – was awarded to Sgt J A Ward for climbing out onto the wing of a Wellington he was second pilot of, when on an operation over Europe, in an attempt to put out an engine fire. Although badly damaged by enemy fighters' cannon shells, the aircraft managed to return to its base.

A rebuilt Lancaster in the Museum of Transport and Technology at Auckland, New Zealand, has the AA codes of one of 75 (NZ) Squadron aircraft. This particular aircraft never saw active service, but was left in New Zealand by the French Navy, and gifted to the people of New Zealand. The only aircraft in 75 (NZ) Squadron to achieve more than 100 operations was Lancaster NE181 (JN-M). Attempts were made to have this aircraft brought back to New Zealand in 1945 but the New Zealand Government would not pay for her to be brought to New Zealand. All of the surviving 75 (NZ) Squadron aircraft were scrapped in 1947–48. The National Archives features an interview with Gordon Ford, a British wireless operator who served with 75 (NZ) Squadron in World War II.
