= North American P-51 Mustang in New Zealand service =

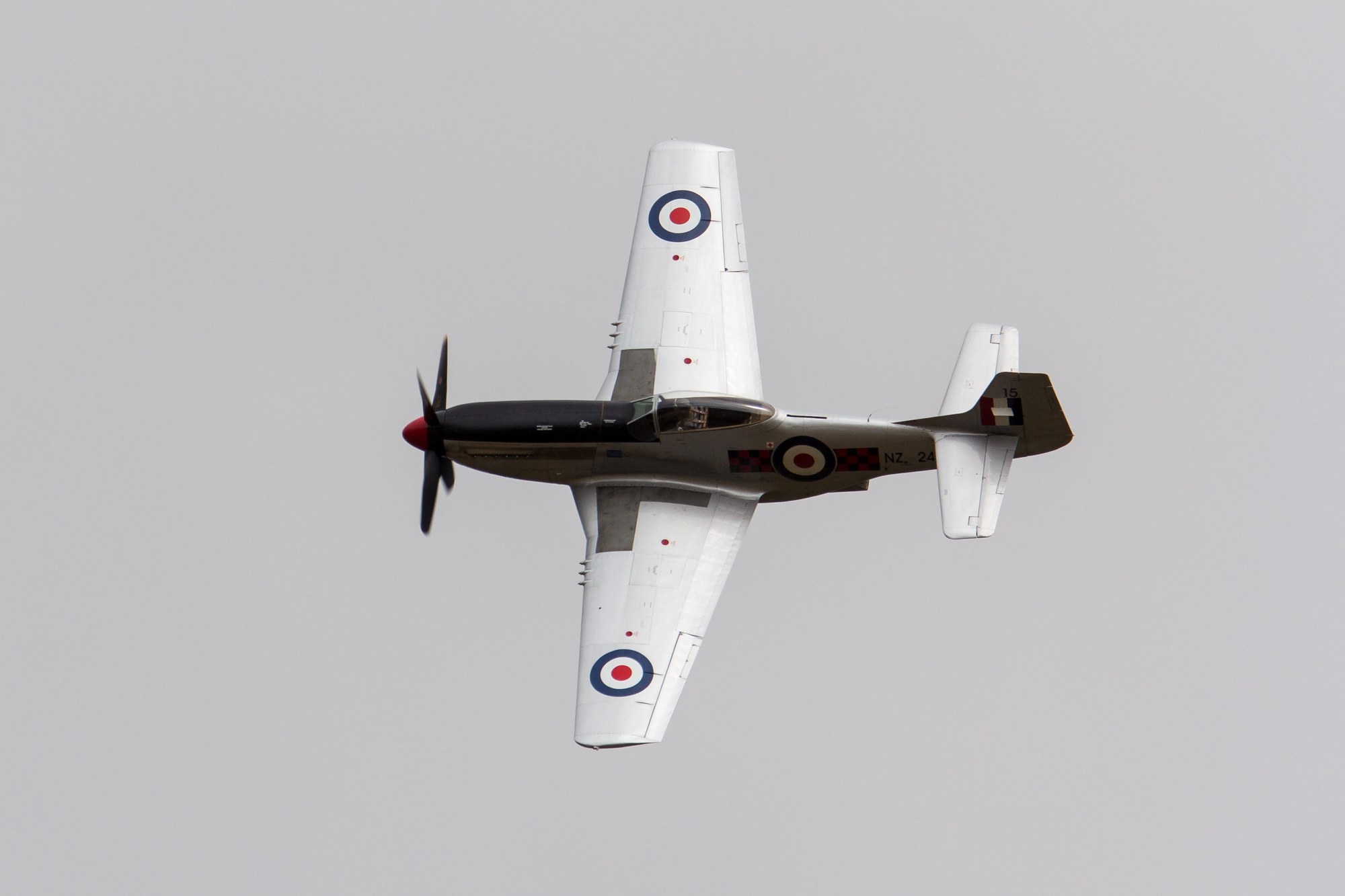
A restored North American P-51 Mustang in the markings of No. 3 (Canterbury) Squadron, Territorial Air Force.

Developed as a fighter interceptor, the North American P-51 Mustang was widely used during the Second World War. New Zealand ordered 130 Mustangs in early 1945 but the first 30 of these were placed in storage when they arrived in the country later in the year due to the end of the war. The remainder of the order was cancelled. In 1951, the stored Mustangs were assembled for use by the New Zealand Territorial Air Force and equipped four of its fighter squadrons until withdrawn from service in 1955. A few were also operated by the Royal New Zealand Air Force until 1957. The surviving Mustangs were sold off, most of them for scrap.

== Background ==
The North American P-51 Mustang was developed as a fighter interceptor in 1940 by North American Aviation. In addition to the United States Army Air Force, it served with the air forces of a number of countries including the Royal Air Force, the Royal Australian Air Force, the Royal Canadian Air Force, the Swedish Air Force, the French Armee de L'air, the Israeli Defence Force, and the Philippine Air Force, among others.

== Acquisition ==
In early 1945 the New Zealand government purchased 130 P-51D Mustangs, (Note: Sources vary on exactly how many aircraft were ordered; Anderson says 130 while more recent works, by military historians Ian McGibbon and Matthew Wright, give totals of 370 and 167 respectively.) to be delivered towards the end of the year at a cost of US$61,000 per aircraft plus shipping expenses. The P-51D was the most numerous of the various Mustang models, a total of 8,102 being built by the end of the war.

At the time of their purchase, the intention was for the P-51Ds to operate alongside, and then replace, the Vought F4U Corsair fighter bombers being used by the Royal New Zealand Air Force (RNZAF) in the Southwest Pacific theatre of operations, supporting United States forces during the Solomon Islands campaign. The Corsairs were to then be phased out of service in 1946, with the P-51D becoming the principal fighter aircraft of the RNZAF.

The first 30 Mustangs were delivered to New Zealand in August–September, along with 12 spare Rolls-Royce Merlin engines. By this time, the Second World War was over, Japan having surrendered following the Atomic bombings of Hiroshima and Nagasaki. The Mustangs were deemed to be surplus to requirements and the remainder of the order was cancelled. However, the aircraft already in New Zealand could not be returned. They were duly placed on the RNZAF inventory as NZ2401 to NZ2430 but put into storage at RNZAF Station Hobsonville. Later, they were moved to the stores depot at Te Rapa and then onto Ardmore.

== Operational history ==
=== Territorial Air Force ===
In late 1948, the long dormant Territorial Air Force (TAF) was reestablished as part of the New Zealand government's moves to improve its ability to mobilise its military forces in the event of an outbreak of hostilities. The TAF squadrons were intended to have a fighter role but there were no available aircraft at the time. Accordingly, a decision was made by the RNZAF to activate the stored Mustangs. Beginning in August 1951, the Mustangs were taken out of storage, assembled, and delivered to the TAF squadrons. Recruitment to the TAF had been slow, not helped by the usage of the dated de Havilland Tiger Moth and North American Harvards that initially equipped the four TAF squadrons but improved once the Mustangs entered service.

The first TAF squadron to receive its allotment of four Mustangs was No. 4 (Otago) Squadron. The following year, each of No. 1 to No. 3 Squadrons received five Mustangs. The remaining Mustangs, seven in total, were assembled and placed in storage at Rukuhia to be called upon as replacement aircraft for the TAF. During assembly, one was found to have been damaged, probably when its crate was dropped when being disembarked on arrival in New Zealand. It and another of the replacements were subsequently cannibalised for parts without ever seeing service.

TAF Operators
Squadron	Territory	Base	Colours
No. 1	Auckland	Whenuapai	Blue/White
No. 2	Wellington	Ohakea	Black/Gold
No. 3	Canterbury	Wigram	Black/Red
No. 4	Otago	Taieri	Blue/Gold

The Mustangs were a natural metal finish when first assembled but then had the majority of its upper and flight surfaces painted in silver; the remainder of the aircraft was polished. Standard RNZAF roundels were used, these being placed over the star of the USAAF markings and leaving the bars extending either side. The bars were later replaced with a checkerboard pattern, the colours depending on the territorial colours of the squadron.

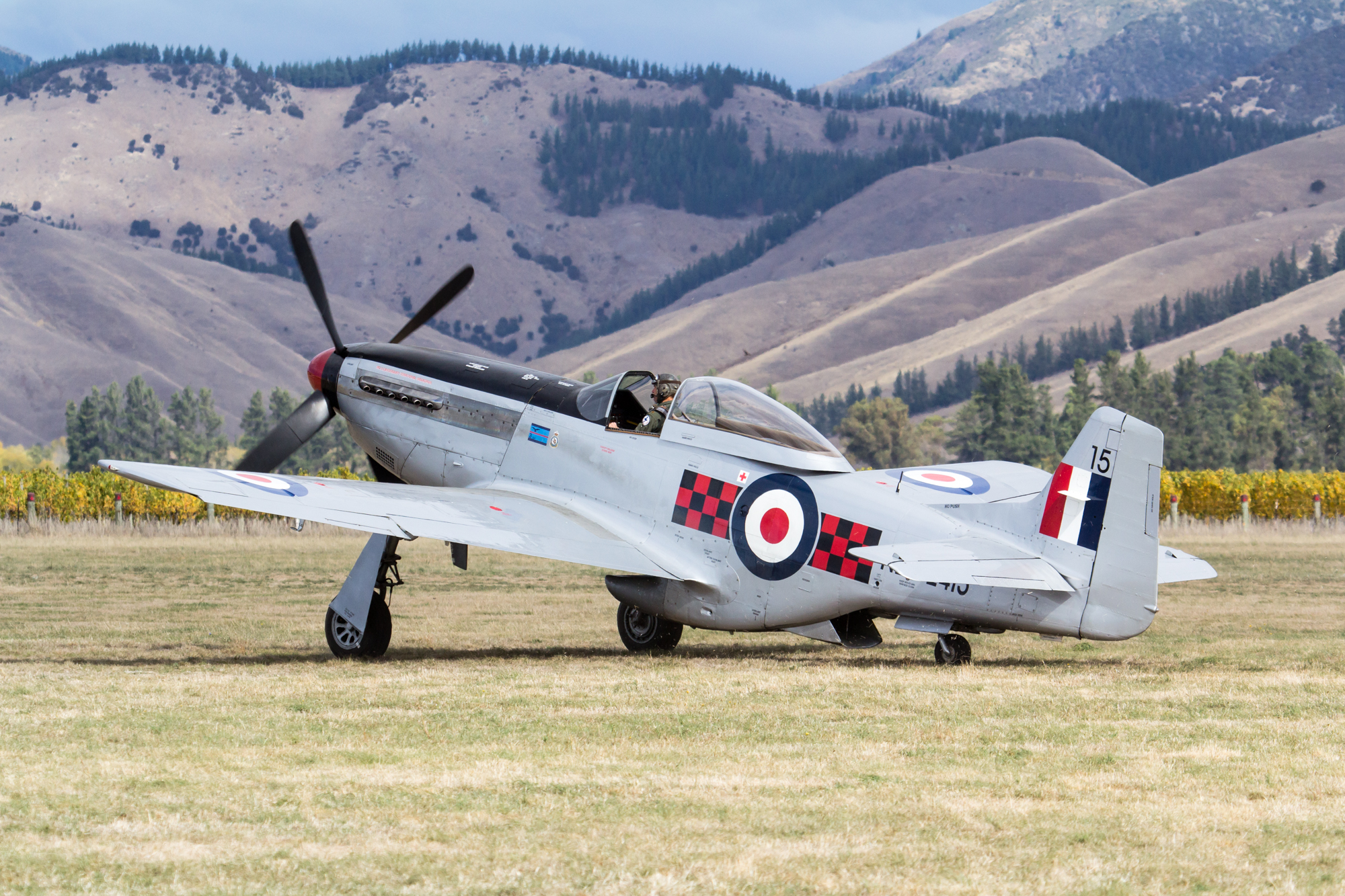
A North American P-51 Mustang in the markings of the TAF's No. 3 Squadron; the checkerboard pattern either side of the roundel is readily apparent

The Mustangs were seen as a significant advance over the existing aircraft of the TAF. They were used for rocket and air-to-ground gunnery exercises, other training activities, and aerobatics. However, Wing Commander Johnny Checketts, the commander of RNZAF Station Taieri, the base for No. 4 Squadron, considered the aircraft unsuitable for inexperienced TAF pilots.

Once they entered service with the TAF, the Mustangs suffered a relatively high rate of incidents. In September 1952, a Mustang of No. 3 Squadron, while flying over Lyttelton Harbour at 35,000 feet (11,000 m), went into a dive and crashed into the sea. The cause was believed to be a failure in the pilot's oxygen system. In 1955, two pilots were killed flying Mustangs; one aircraft of No. 1 Squadron crashed at sea on 20 March and the pilot's body was not recovered while a Mustang of No. 3 Squadron broke up in midair over Springston on 23 April.

By 1955, the Mustangs were experiencing an increasing number of technical problems with their undercarriage and coolant piping. In No. 3 Squadron, only one Mustang was available for flying at the start of the year, which affected morale amongst the flying personnel and saw a drop in attendance at the squadron's parades and training sessions. Although replacement aircraft was provided, within a matter of weeks these too were unserviceable. In July, it was announced that all Mustangs would be withdrawn from service and the following month they were transported or flown to the RNZAF base at Woodbourne for long-term storage.

At the time of their withdrawal from service, ten of the TAF's Mustangs had been damaged or destroyed, a relatively high number given the number of aircraft in service. Two of those damaged were subsequently assigned to No. 4 Technical Training School while the airframe of another was designated for use as a target on the Ohakea air base gunnery range. It had been intended to replace the Mustangs with de Havilland Vampires but this did not eventuate and the TAF squadrons operated Harvards until their disbandment in 1957.

=== Full-time squadrons ===
Two Mustangs, part of the first group of six aircraft to be assembled, went to the RNZAF's Central Flying School. In June 1952, these two Mustangs were later transferred to Nos. 14 and 75 Squadrons and used for towing targets for gunnery practice. No. 42 Squadron received a Mustang that was transferred from one of the TAF squadrons. While the TAF ceased its use of the Mustang in August 1955, the last operational flight of a RNZAF Mustang, this being NZ2423, was on 30 May 1957.

== Disposal ==
In August 1957, the 19 surviving Mustangs stored at Woodbourne were put up for tender along with other surplus RNZAF aircraft. Three were sold as complete aircraft and the rest broken up and sold for scrap. One of the complete Mustangs, NZ2417, purchased by J. McDonald and R. M. Fechney, was rebuilt and, with sponsorship from Mobil, was used on 4 February 1965 to break the air-speed record for the flight from Dunedin to Auckland. Its flight time of 1 hour, 48 minutes was five minutes faster than the previous record flight, set in 1950 by a de Havilland Mosquito. This aircraft ceased flying in 1968 and was later sold to a buyer in the United States. It remains airworthy in the United States as N921 with Fantasy of Flight, marked as Major George Preddy's aircraft Cripes A' Mighty 3rd.

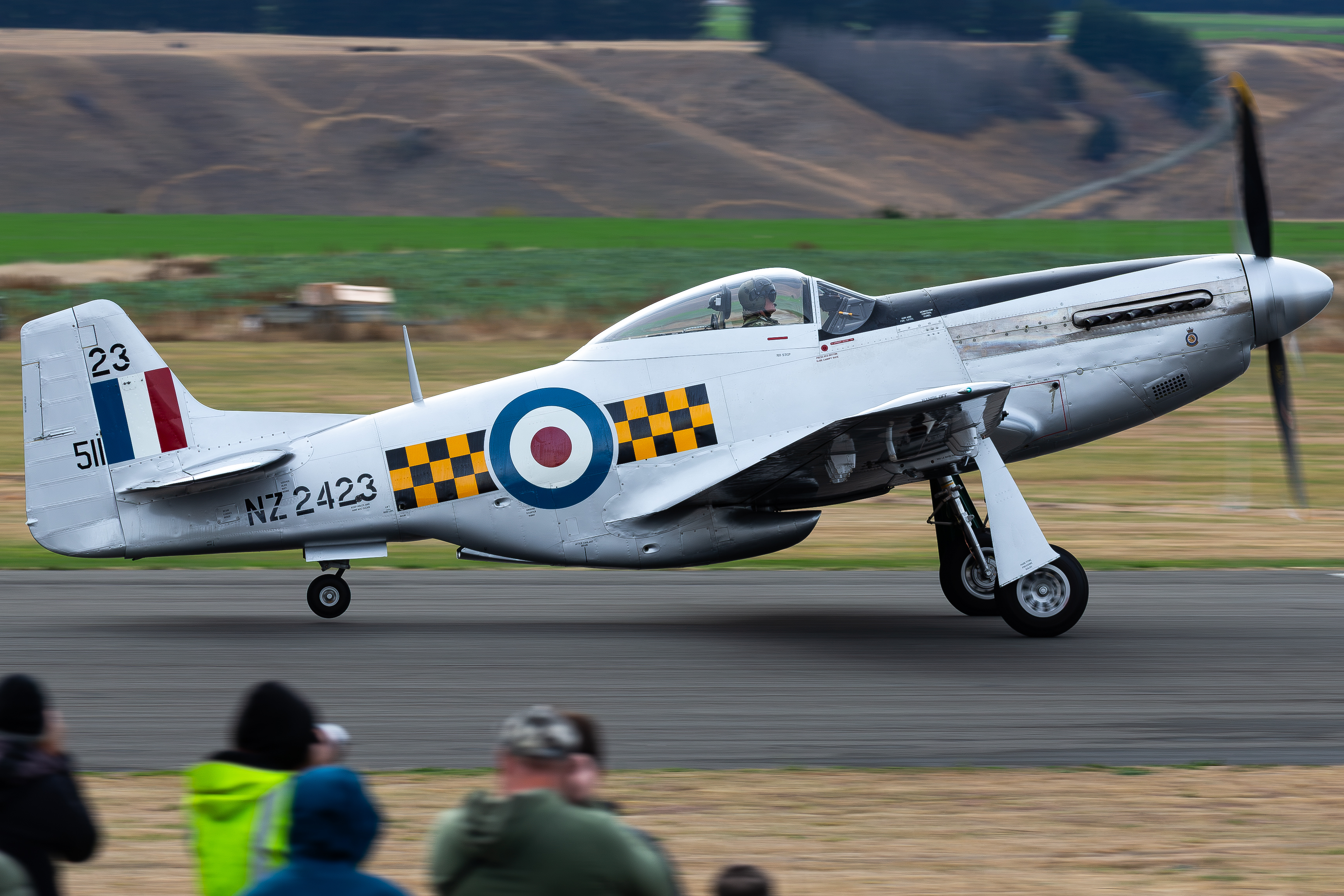
P-51D Mustang NZ2423 sporting the black and gold checkerboard pattern of No. 2 Squadron

Two other RNZAF Mustangs are known to still be in existence:

- NZ2423 of No. 2 Squadron, restored to airworthiness at Ohakea, New Zealand, for Brendon Deere of the Biggin Hill Historic Aircraft Centre. Repainted in its original squadron colours, it was flown at the 'Warbirds Over New Zealand' airshow in 2024.
- NZ2427 of No. 3 Squadron, restored to airworthiness as a TF-51D at Dunmow, United Kingdom, for Fighter Aviation Engineering Limited as G-CLNV after a crash in 2016. Before the crash, it flew as Major Bill Price's Janie, registered G-MSTG.

A Mustang is displayed in RNZAF markings at the Air Force Museum of New Zealand. Since none of the original aircraft as used by the RNZAF were available for the museum to acquire, the displayed Mustang was sourced from the Indonesian Air Force in 1985 and rebuilt as a P-51D.
