= Emirau Airport =

Airport in Emirau Island, New Ireland, Papua New Guinea

- IATA: EMI; ICAO: AYEE

Summary
- Location: Emirau Island, Papua New Guinea
- Elevation AMSL: 100 ft (30 m)
- Coordinates: 1°38.5′S 149°58.5′E

Map
- Location of airport in Papua New Guinea

Runways
Direction	Length		Surface
Direction	m	ft	Surface
12/30	1,455	4,773
- Source: PNG Airstrip Guide

Emirau Airport is an airfield in Emirau Island, Papua New Guinea.

== History ==
=== World War II ===
Emirau Airfield
- Emirau Island
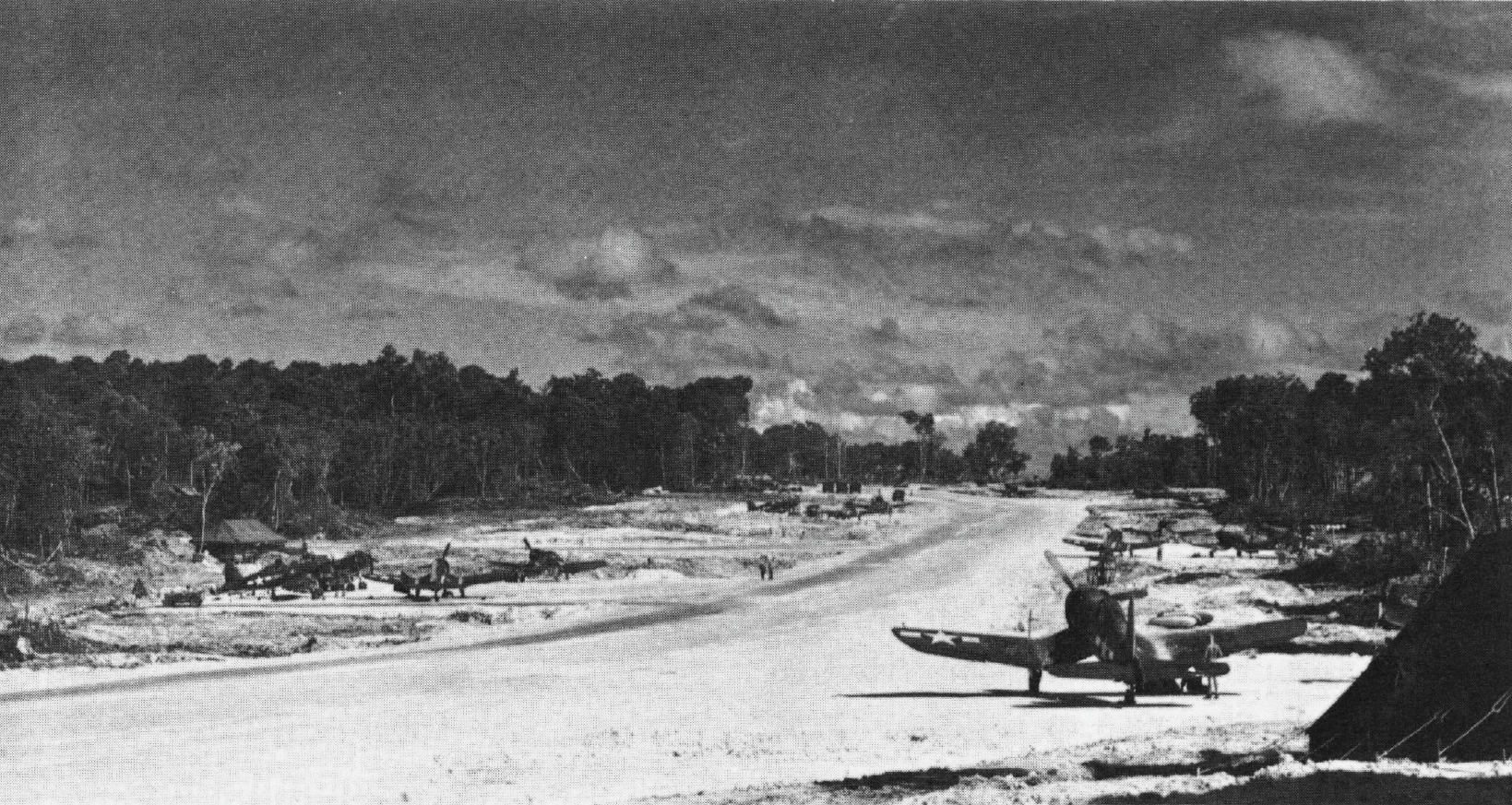
- F4Us on Emirau

Site information
- Type: Military Airfield
- Controlled by: United States Marine Corps; Royal New Zealand Air Force

Location
- Coordinates: 01°38.5′S 149°58.5′E

Site history
- Built: 1944
- Built by: Seabees
- In use: 1944-present
- Materials: Coral

Emirau was seized unopposed by two Battalions of the 4th Marine Regiment on 20 March 1944. Naval Construction Battalions arrived shortly after the landings and began construction of two coral-surfaced 7,000 feet (2,100 m) by 150 feet (46 m) airfields on the island. Inshore Airfield had 35 double hardstands capable of parking 210 fighter or light-bomber planes, while North Cape Airfield had 42 hardstands with space for parking 84 heavy bombers. Both were fully equipped with towers, lighting, and a dispensary. The aviation tank farm consisted of three 1,000 barrels (~140 t) tanks and nineteen 1,000 barrels (~140 t) together with the appropriate filling and distribution points. A reserve of 40,000 barrels (~5,500 t) was stored in drums. Emirau was the staging point for attacks on the Japanese strongholds at Rabaul and Kavieng.

US Marine Corps units based here included:

- VMSB-243 operating SBDs from June–December 1944
- VMB-413 operating PBJs
- VMB-433 operating PBJs
- VMB-443 operating PBJs
- VMB-611 operating PBJs

Royal New Zealand Air Force units based here included:

- No. 1 Squadron operating PV-1s from May–June 1945
- No. 3 Squadron operating PV-1s
- No. 4 Squadron operating PV-1s from November 1944-February 1945 and June–July 1945
- No. 8 Squadron operating PV-1s from February–March 1945
- No. 9 Squadron operating PV-1s from March–May 1945
- No. 14 Squadron operating F4Us from July–August 1945
- No. 19 Squadron operating F4Us from November 1944-January 1945
- No. 22 Squadron operating F4Us from January–March 1945
- No. 23 Squadron from March–May 1945
- No. 25 Squadron operating F4Us from May–July 1945

There was also one Australian unit located on the island - the 474 Heavy Anti-aircraft Troop.

Base roll-up commenced in December 1944 and was completed by May 1945.

=== Postwar ===
The runways remain usable.
