= No. 22 Squadron RNZAF =

No. 22 Squadron
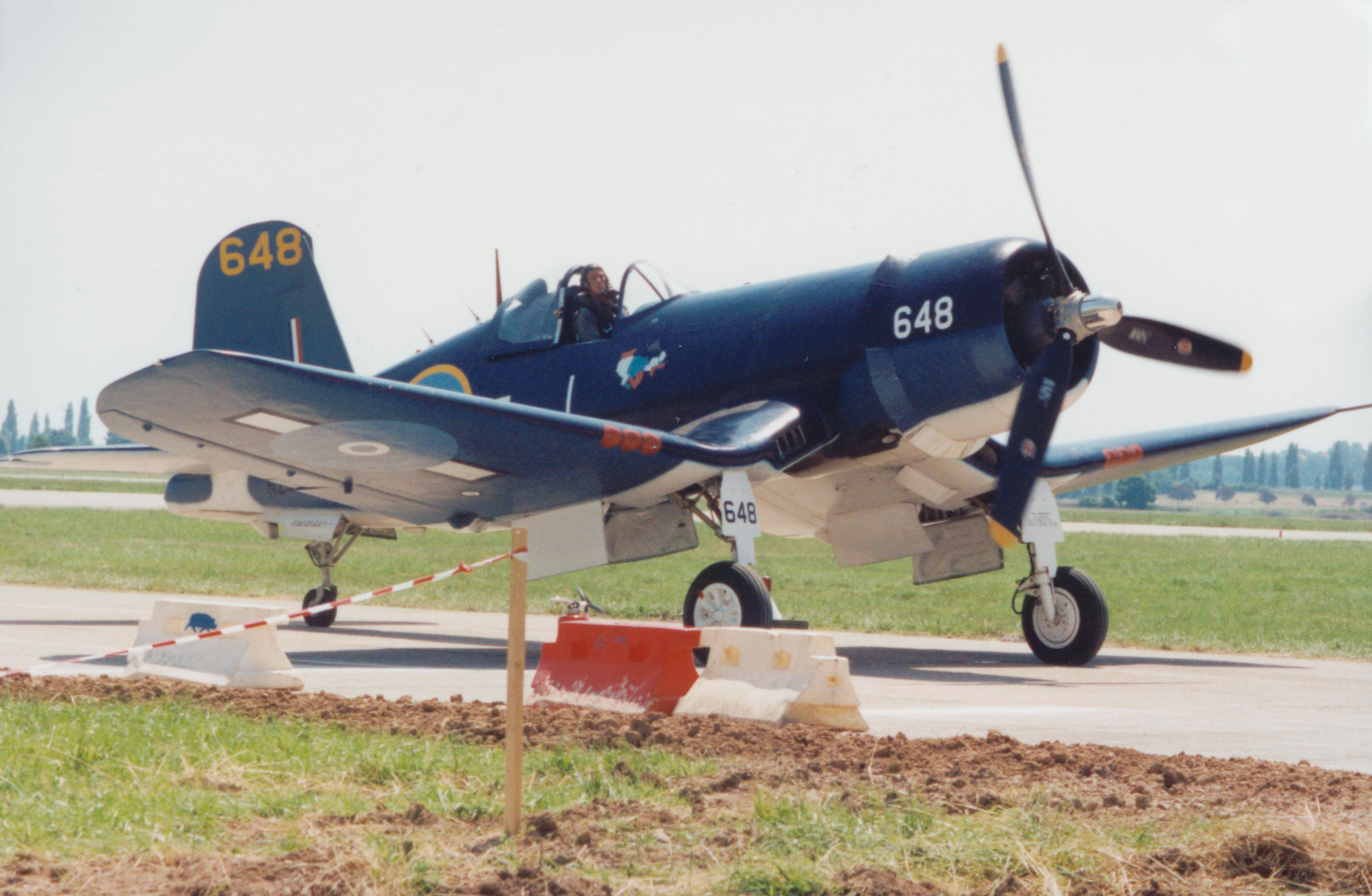
- Corsair FG-1D (Goodyear built F4U-1D) in the Royal New Zealand Air Force markings
- Active: August 1942- September 1945
- Country: New Zealand
- Branch: Royal New Zealand Air Force
- Type: Fighter bomber
- Garrison/HQ: RNZAF Station Onerahi
- Motto: 'Patuo Kia Mate'
- Engagements: World War II: Pacific theatre

No. 22 Squadron RNZAF was a squadron of the Royal New Zealand Air Force. Formed in August 1942, during World War II, at RNZAF Station Onerahi equipped with the Hawker Hind, co-ordinating with New Zealand Army units providing training for air liaison officers. Reformed on 19 June 1944 at RNZAF Station Ardmore, equipped with Chance-Vought F4U-1 Corsair fighter bombers. The squadron served at airfields in Espiritu Santo, Guadalcanal, Bougainville and Emirau before being disbanded in September 1945.

== Insignia and Motto ==
22 Squadron flew under the insignia of a Katipo Spider, which was placed on the engine cowlings of their Corsair's. Their motto - 'Patuo Kia Mate' means, 'Strike to Kill' and the squadron was known as the Katipo Squadron, or 'The Katipos', similar how to No.23 Squadron was known as 'The Ghosts'.

== Commanding officers ==
- Wing Commander J.G. Fraser
- Squadron Leader B. H. Thomson
- Squadron Leader J. R. Court
- Squadron Leader G. A. Delves
