= VMB-433 =

Marine Bombing Squadron 433
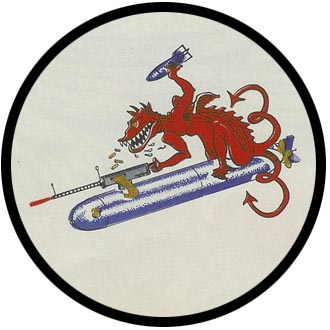
- VMB-413 insignia
- Active: 15 September 1943 – 30 November 1945
- Country: United States
- Allegiance: United States of America
- Branch: United States Marine Corps
- Type: Bomber
- Role: Aerial interdiction Aerial reconnaissance
- Part of: Inactive
- Nickname: "Fork-Tailed Devils"
- Tail Code: DT
- Engagements: World War II

Aircraft flown
- Bomber: PBJ

Marine Bombing Squadron 433 (VMB-433) was a United States Marine Corps medium bomber squadron during World War II. Nicknamed the "Fork-tailed Devils", the squadron flew PBJ medium bombers which were the naval version of the B-25 Mitchell. The squadron participated in combat operations in the Pacific Theater and was quickly deactivated after the war.

== History ==
VMB-433 was commissioned on 15 September 1943 at Marine Corps Air Station Cherry Point, North Carolina. The squadron also received initial training at Marine Corps Air Station Edenton and Marine Corps Air Facility Peterfield Point, North Carolina. Upon completion, the squadron joined MarFAirWest on 27 January 1944 and continued their training syllabus at Marine Corps Air Station El Centro, California.

By 26 May 1944 the ground echelon was underway, bound for the Northern Solomons. The following day the flight echelon departed, arriving at Marine Corps Air Station Ewa on 1 June 1944. After staging through Palmyra, Canton, Funafuti and Espiritu Santo, the squadron arrived at Green Island on 14 July 1944 for temporary duty with Marine Aircraft Group 14. One month later, the squadron had redeployed, and both echelons were operating at Emirau with Marine Aircraft Group 61. On 16 August 1945, VMB-433 departed Emirau for Titcomb Field at Malabang in the Philippines, arriving there just as the war ended. VMB-433 was decommissioned at Marine Corps Air Station Miramar, California on 30 November 1945 following the squadron's return to the United States.

During the course of the war the squadron had 17 marines killed in action and lost 3 aircraft, 1 to mechanical issues and 2 to combat.

== Unit awards ==
A unit citation or commendation is an award bestowed upon an organization for the action cited. Members of the unit who participated in said actions are allowed to wear on their uniforms the awarded unit citation. VMB-433 was presented with the following awards:

Streamer	Award	Year(s)	Additional Info
	American Defense Service Streamer with one Bronze Star	1941	World War II
	Asiatic-Pacific Campaign Streamer with two Bronze Stars		
	World War II Victory Streamer	1941–1945	Pacific War

== See also ==
- United States Marine Corps Aviation
- List of active United States Marine Corps aircraft squadrons
- List of decommissioned United States Marine Corps aircraft squadrons
