= VMA-611 =

Marine Attack Squadron 611
- Active: 1 Oct 1943 – 30 Nov 1945; 15 Apr 1958 – 1 Mar 1969
- Country: United States
- Allegiance: United States of America
- Branch: United States Marine Corps
- Type: Bomber
- Role: Attack
- Part of: Inactive
- Tail Code: DT
- Engagements: World War II

Aircraft flown
- Bomber: PBJ-1C/D/J

Marine Attack Squadron 611 (VMA-611) was an attack squadron in the United States Marine Corps Reserve. The squadron was originally commissioned as a medium bomber squadron flying PBJ-1C/Ds during World War II. VMB-611 was the only Marine bomber squadron to operate in the Philippines during the war and was quickly decommissioned following the surrender of Japan. The squadron was reactivated as an attack squadron in the Reserves in 1958 at Naval Air Station Glenview, Illinois. It was later relocated to Naval Air Station Los Alamitos, California, in 1968, and finally decommissioned in 1969.

== History ==
=== World War II ===
==== Commissioning, stateside training and movement west ====
Marine Bombing Squadron 611 (VMB-611) was commissioned on 1 October 1943, at Marine Corps Air Station Cherry Point, North Carolina. The squadron moved to Marine Corps Air Station Parris Island, South Carolina, in January 1944 to conduct initial flight training. During this time the squadron trained in bomb dropping, formation flying, low level attacks, and flying and navigating at night. During this time the squadron also deployed to Key West, Florida, returning to MCAS Cherry Point for additional training in July 1944.

The squadron's flight echelon departed from San Diego on 24 August 1944, on board the USS Manila Bay (CVE-61) headed for Marine Corps Air Station Ewa, Hawaii. Beginning in Early September the squadron's aircraft were fitted with High Velocity Aircraft Rocket (HVAR) launchers and LORAN navigations systems at Naval Air Station Barbers Point. The squadron's rear echelon departed Marine Corps Air Station Miramar at the end of September arriving at Pearl Harbor on 2 October 1944.

Planes from VMB-611 departed MCAS Ewa in four sticks between 21 and 23 October 1944. The aircraft flew through Palmyra Atoll, Canton Island, Funafuti, Espiritu Santo, and Munda en route to their final destination of Emirau. During the transit the squadron lost two aircraft. One plane was lost at Canton when it struck a sunken gas tank while taxiing. Another aircraft overshot the runway while attempting a single-engine landing at Turtle Bay near Espiritu Santo. The plane ran off the runway into a swamp.

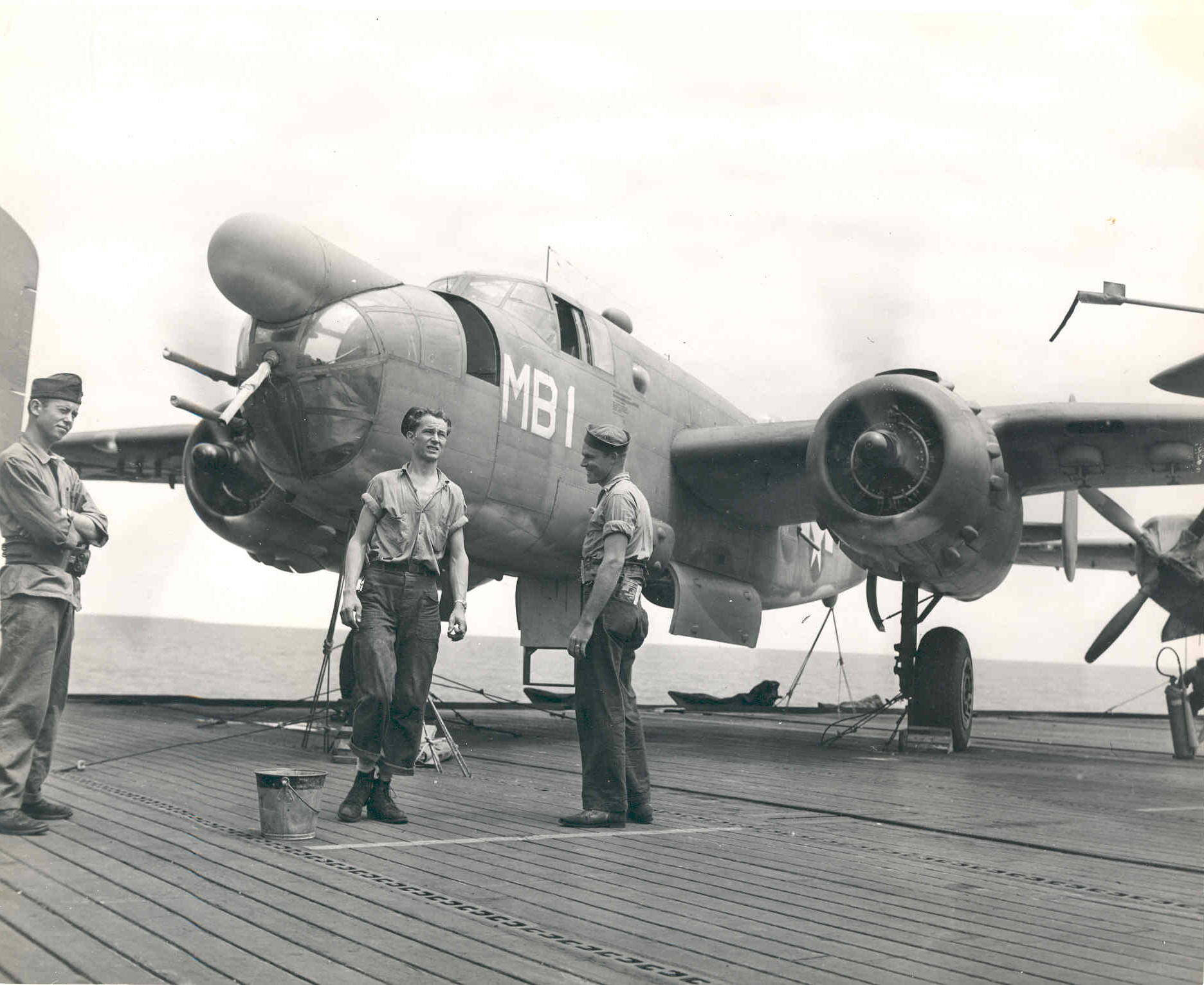
PBJ-1D from VMB-611 on the flight deck of the USS Manila Bay in August 1944.

==== Operations from Emirau ====
The squadron's first combat mission took place on 17 November 1944, when the squadron commander, Lt. Col George A. Sarles, flew a night harassment mission over Kavieng. For the remainder of November, the squadron flew three additional night harassment missions against Kavieng and one air strike against a rubber plantation on New Ireland. During January 1945, VMB-611 continued to fly low level attacks against Japanese targets on New Ireland, Rabaul, and Kavieng. On 22 January the squadron flew its first attacks against Wotje.

==== Six months at sea ====
Ground echelon personnel from the squadron departed Port Hueneme on board the cargo ship Zoella Lykes (MC-83) originally tasked with taking part in the invasion of Yap. En route to Yap, orders were changed, and the men spent the next six months at sea convoying between different anchorages in the Pacific awaiting follow on tasking. Along the way they spent time at or off the coast of Eniwetok, Ulithi, Kossol Roads, Tacloban, Samar, and Lingayen Gulf before disembarking at Mindoro on 15 March 1945. Two days later the men boarded LSTs for the trip to Moret Field where they began to set up squadron facilities while awaiting the arrival of aircraft and flight crew.

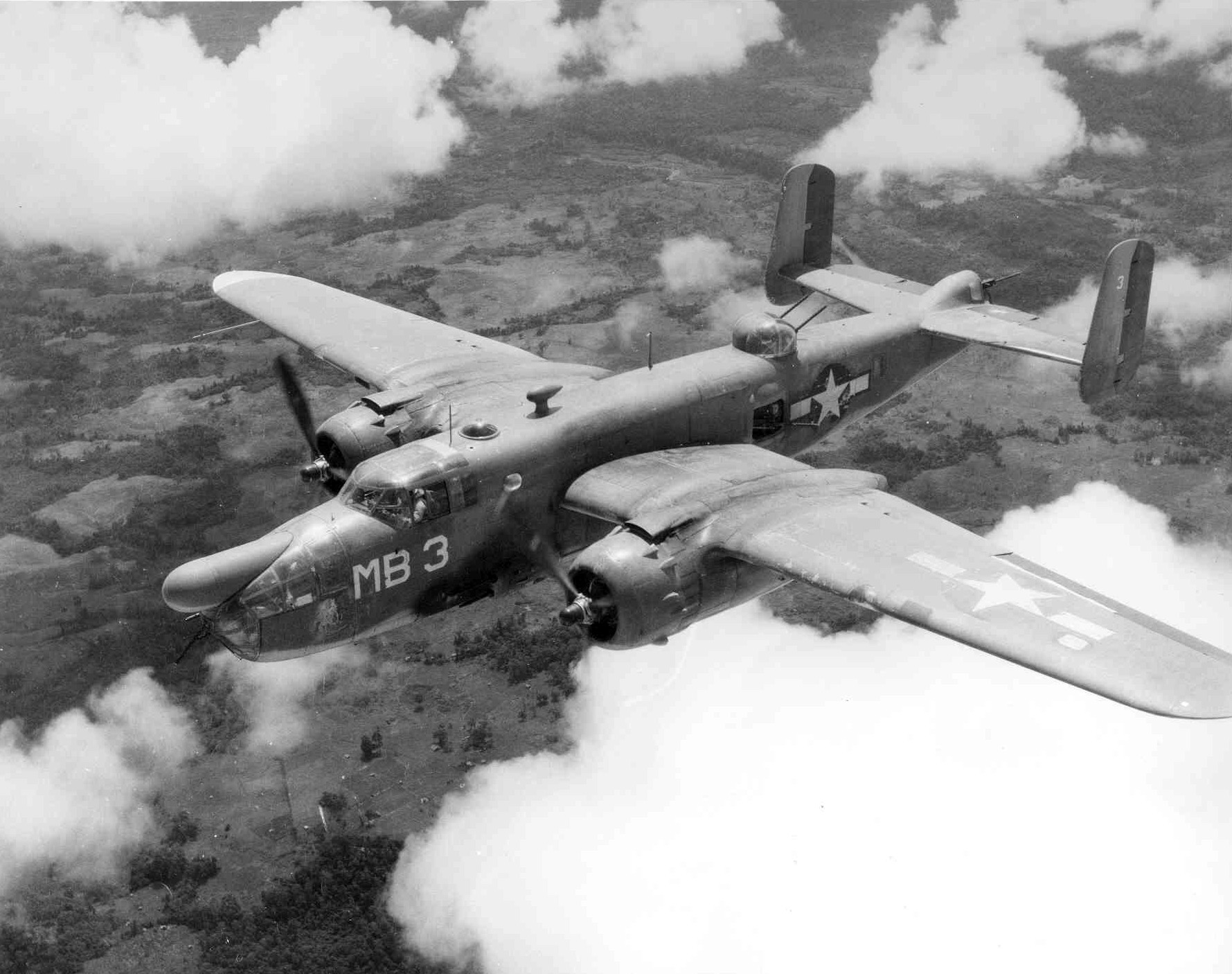
A North American PBJ-1D Mitchell of U.S. Marine Corps bombing squadron VMB-611 in flight.

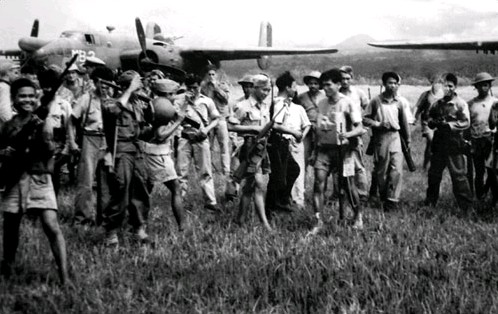
Philippine guerillas greet the crew of a VMB-611 PBJ-1D Mitchell on Mindanao in 1945.

==== Operations in the Philippines ====
At a meeting on 11 February 1945, Far East Air Forces planners tasked Marine Corps aviation with supporting operations in the Southern Philippines beginning with the invasion of Mindanao as part of the ongoing campaign to retake the Philippines. Additional squadrons were brought in to support these landings to include VMB-611. In the beginning of March 1945, VMB-611 was still flying missions against Japanese bases at Kavieng, Tobera and New Ireland. The squadron received word of its new tasking on 7 March, was transferred that same day to Marine Aircraft Group 32 and spent the next three weeks preparing for its next mission. On 29 March 1945, 15 PBJs departed Emirau in 4 different sections then overnighted in Owi Airfield. Squadron aircraft arrived at Moret Field in Zamboanga, Philippines, on 30 March 1945. VMB-611 flew its first combat mission in the Philippines the next day when four aircraft conducted night heckling missions against Japanese targets on Bongao Island.

Attached to MAG-32 in the Philippines, VMB-611 immediately began flying long range patrols over Borneo and Mandoro. Early April saw the squadron conducting close air support (CAS) and air interdiction in support of United States Army forces operating on Jolo. On 7 April 1945, six aircraft from the squadron conducted CAS in support of Filipino guerillas as they recaptured Malabang Airfield. Prior to dropping bomb, two of the six aircraft landed on the field with Japanese troops only 1000 yards away, coordinated with the guerillas, then took off and began the mission. On 17 April, actor and comedian Joe E. Brown, who was in the Philippines with the USO, accompanied LtCol Sarles on a reconnaissance flight over Parang to observe the 24th Infantry Division conduct an amphibious landing.

For the remainder of the Philippine campaign, VMB-611 continued to provide photo reconnaissance, close air support, air interdiction, night heckling, anti-submarine patrols, troop transport, and other missions as required. The squadron suffered a 27% casualty rate among aircrew due to enemy fire. LtCol George A. Sarles, the squadron's long-standing and much loved commanding officer, was killed when his aircraft was struck by enemy anti-aircraft fire on 30 May 1945. On 9 August 1945, VMB-611 bombers, escorted by fighters from VMF-115, conducted airstrikes against the Japanese Army's 100th Division Headquarters after receiving intelligence and briefings on the location of the headquarters from Japanese Army Lieutenant Minoru Wada. VMB-611 suffered 32 killed in action and 32 wounded in action during the course of the war. On 27 August 1945, the forward echelon of the squadron departed the Philippines for Peleliu.

On 15 September 1945, the squadron was transferred back under the command of Marine Aircraft Group 61 (MAG-61). Routine training flights continued through September and October with the exception of 10 plane flight that escorted F4U Corsairs from Marine Aircraft Group 12 to Peiping, China, between 21 and 29 October 1945. The squadron's last flight took place on 4 November after which the aircraft were flown to Naval Air Station Barbers Point, Hawaii. Squadron ground personnel departed from Zamboanga on 8 November 1945, on board the USS Gallatin (APA-169). The ship arrived at San Diego on 30 November and the squadron was decommissioned that same day.

=== Reserve years ===
VMA-611 was reactivated on 15 April 1958, at Naval Air Station Glenview, Illinois. The squadron was awarded the Chief of Naval Operations Aviation Safety Award in September 1964. The squadron was transferred to Naval Air Station Los Alamitos, California, in 1968. VMA-611 was decommissioned on 1 March 1969, at NAS Los Alamitos, CA.

== Aircraft losses ==
- 22 October 1944 – BuNo 35152 was damaged beyond repair when its right landing gear struck a sunken gas pit while taxiing on Canton Island. No crew members were injured.
- 15 November 1944 – BuNo 35165 crashed on take-off from Emirau. No crew members were seriously injured.
- 17 January 1945 – BuNo 35175 crashed while attempting to land at Emirau when the pilot misjudged his approach angle during a low-light approach. Five squadron personnel were killed.
- 8 April 1945 – BuNo 35193 crash landed in the Basilan Strait after losing power due to issues with the right engine. All crew members survived the landing, were picked up by local Moros in the water and taken to an area just east of Zamboanga City.
- 12 April 1945 – BuNo 35157 was hit by enemy anti-aircraft fire while prosecuting strikes against Del Monte Airfield. The plane crashed at Gitagum while attempting to return to base. PFC Barney Allen died as a result of a fire that broke out in the aircraft following its crash landing.
- 2 May 1945 – BuNo 35200 was hit by enemy anti-aircraft fire while striking a supply dump near Del Monte Airfield. The aircraft crashed killing all personnel on board.
- 30 May 1945 – BuNo 35164 was hit by enemy anti-aircraft fire while engaging targets near Kibawe. The plane crashed after its wing clipped a tree while attempting to pull up. Twelve crew members were killed in the crash with three surviving and making their way back to friendly lines.
- 19 June 1945 – BuNos 35172 & 35194 were conducting low level attacks against targets in the vicinity of Sarangani when they were hit by enemy anit-aircraft fire. BuNo 35172, piloted by Maj Robert R. Davis, crash landed in nearby fields with all crew members surviving. BuNo 35194 crashed into Sarangani Bay killing three crewmembers including the pilot, 1stLt Robert A. Griffith.

== Unit awards ==
A unit citation or commendation is an award bestowed upon an organization for the action cited. Members of the unit who participated in said actions are allowed to wear on their uniforms the awarded unit citation. VMA-611 was presented with the following awards:

Streamer	Award	Year(s)	Additional info
	Navy Unit Commendation Streamer	1945	Philippine campaign
	Asiatic-Pacific Campaign Streamer		
	World War II Victory Streamer	1941–1945	Pacific War
A red streamer with a horizontal gold stripe and three bronze stars in the center	National Defense Service Streamer	1961–1974	Vietnam War
	Philippine Liberation Streamer	1945	World War II

== Gallery ==
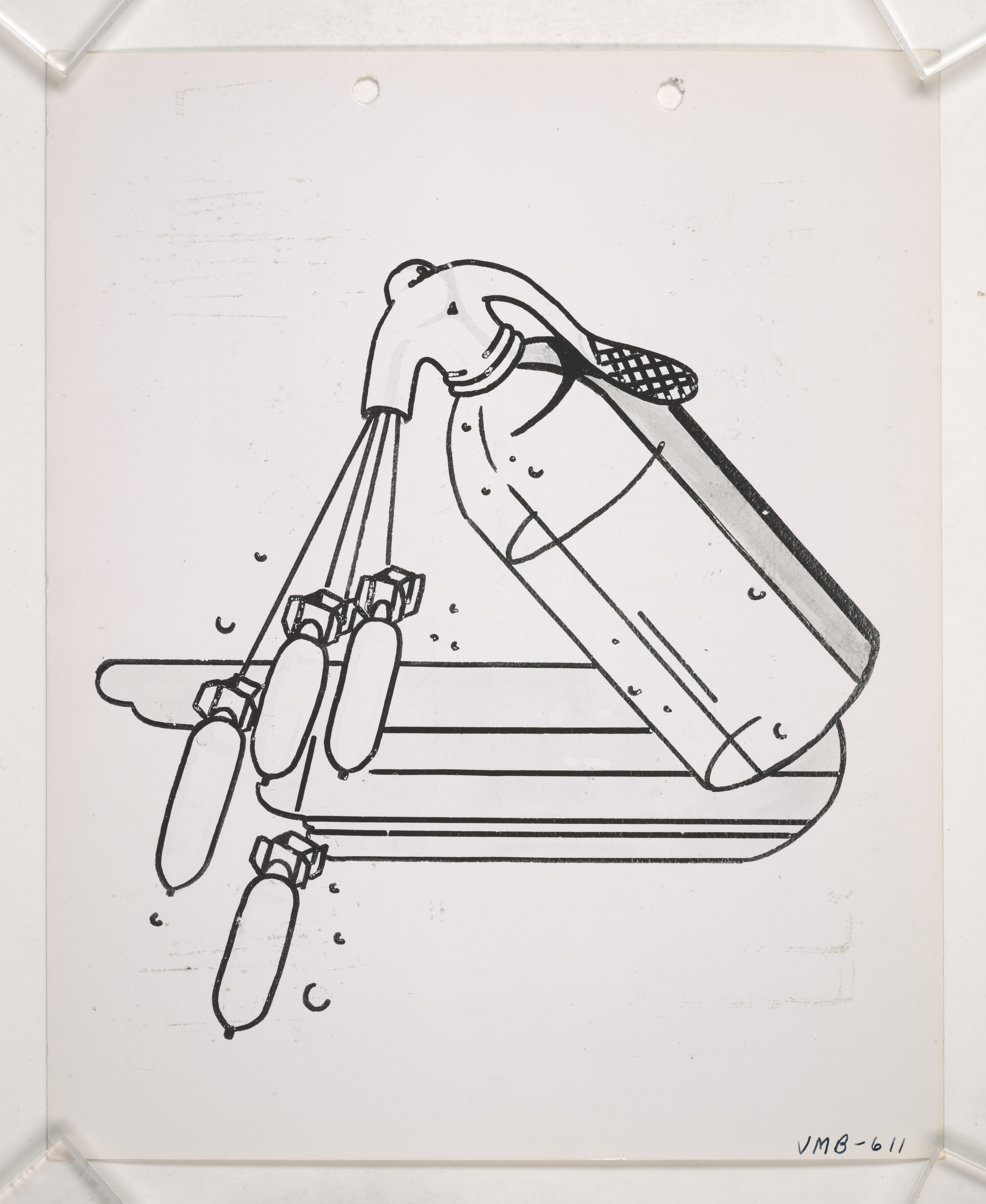
VMB-611 Insignia from WWII

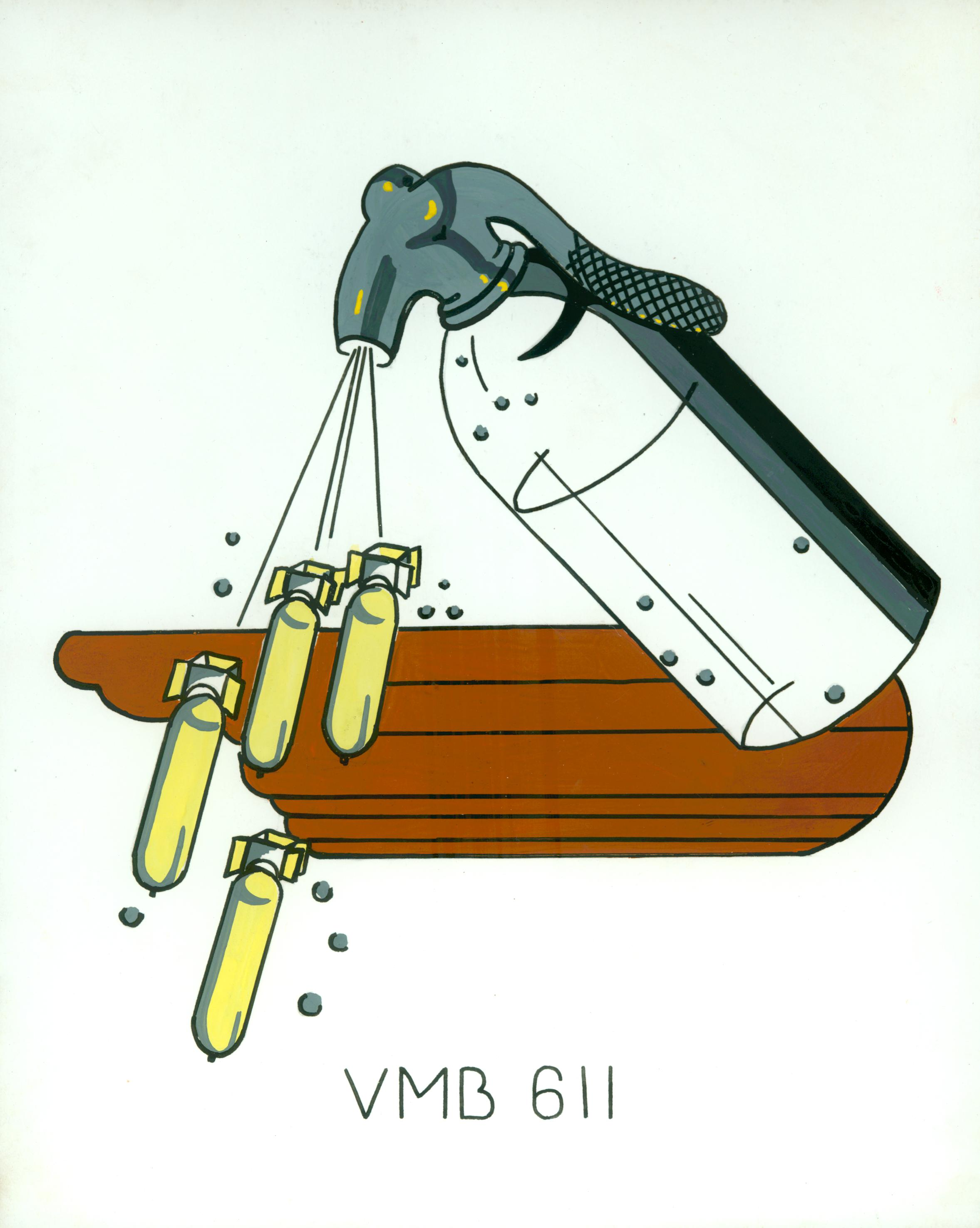
Color version of WWII insignia

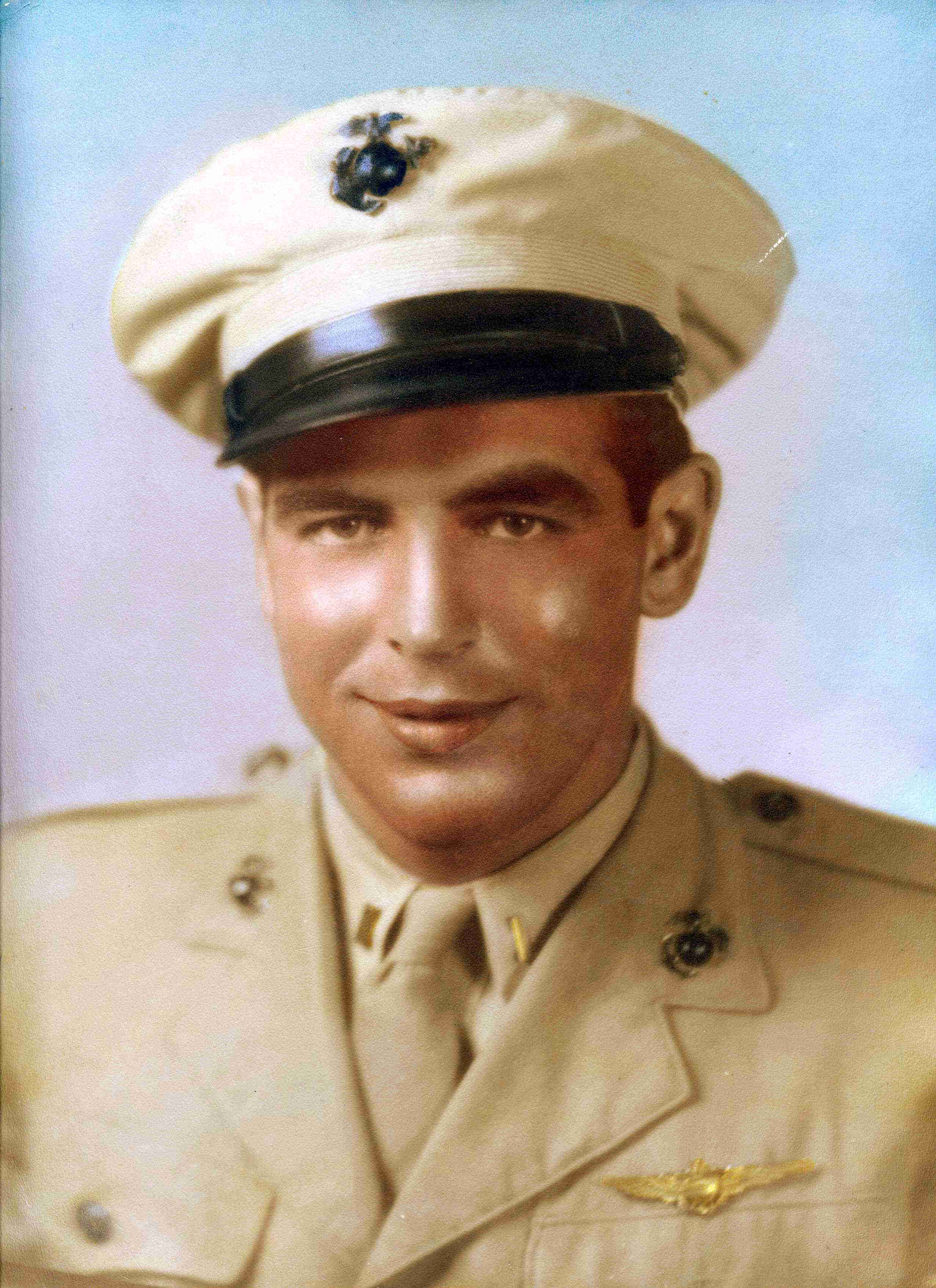
1stLt Doit L. Fish, a pilot w/ VMB-611, was killed on May 30, 1945, when his plane crashed.

== See also ==
- United States Marine Corps Aviation
- List of active United States Marine Corps aircraft squadrons
- List of decommissioned United States Marine Corps aircraft squadrons
