= No. 1 Squadron RNZAF =

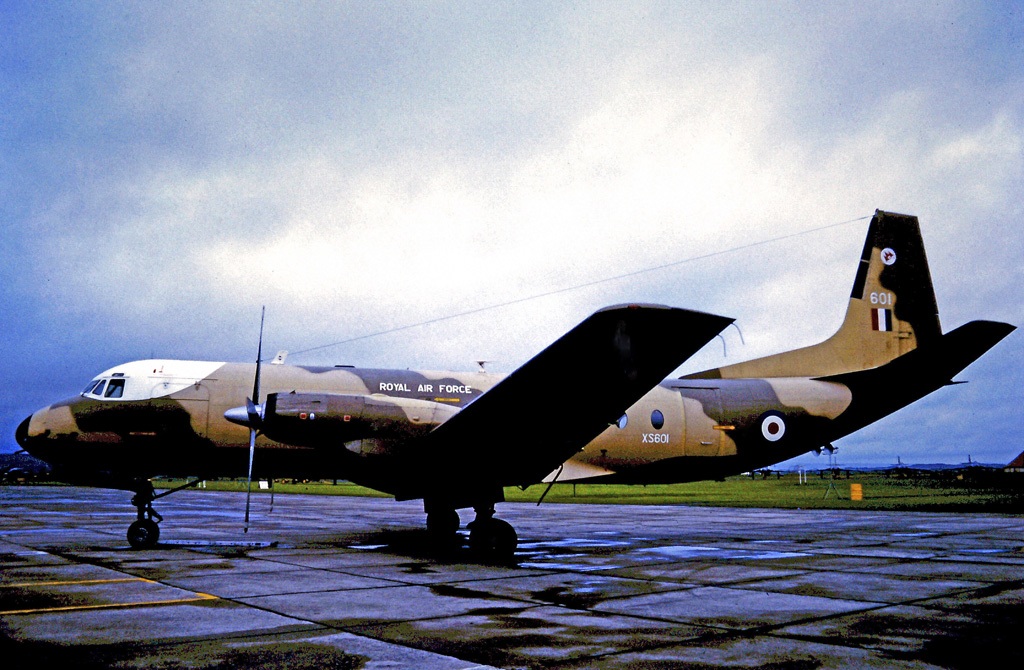
- An Andover C.1
- Active: March 1940 – September 1945 c.1949–1955 1972 – 1984
- Country: New Zealand
- Branch: Royal New Zealand Air Force; New Zealand Territorial Air Force
- Role: Reconnaissance, Transport
- Garrison/HQ: RNZAF Base Auckland
- Motto: With Vigilance We Serve
- Equipment: Bristol 170 Freighter Mk 31, Andover C.1
- Engagements: World War II, Malaysian Emergency

Insignia
- Squadron Badge: A sword and a quill

No. 1 Squadron RNZAF was a New Zealand reconnaissance and patrol bomber squadron operating in the Pacific Theatre during World War II. After the war the squadron served in the transport and VIP role.

== History ==
No. 1 Squadron was formed as the New Zealand General Reconnaissance Squadron in March 1940 with Blackburn Baffins, Vickers Vincents, and Vickers Vildebeest, which were used up to 1941. The first commanding officer, Squadron Leader G.N. Roberts, arrived in May. Due to the threat of German surface raiders against New Zealand shipping, these were replaced with Lockheed Hudsons during 1941. After the outbreak of hostilities against Japan, the squadron was retained in New Zealand, but during 1943 re-equipped with Lockheed Venturas, and joined the other Hudson and Ventura squadrons of the Royal New Zealand Air Force (RNZAF) in the South Pacific islands.

The squadron was based at Kukum Field on Guadalcanal during October and November before moving forward to New Georgia in November 1943. In August 1944 the squadron returned to Guadalcanal, before serving at Green Island in October of that year until again returning to Guadalcanal in March 1945. From May to June the squadron was based at Emirau.

The squadron was disbanded, following VJ Day, in September 1945.

The squadron was reactivated as a reserve Territorial Air Force squadron in Auckland, flying Harvards and North American Mustangs, from 1948 to 1955.

It was re-formed in 1972 to provide a medium-range transport squadron within New Zealand, at Whenuapai and equipped with six of the RNZAF's Bristol 170 Freighter Mk 31s. In 1977, 1 Squadron re-equipped with six Andover C.1s. The No 1 Squadron Standard was presented to the Squadron at a parade at Base Auckland on 17 February 1984. The parade was inspected by Sir Geoffrey Roberts CBE, AFC, LM (US) who had been the first CO when the Squadron was formed in 1941.

The squadron was again disbanded on 7 December 1984 and its Andovers taken over by No. 42 Squadron.

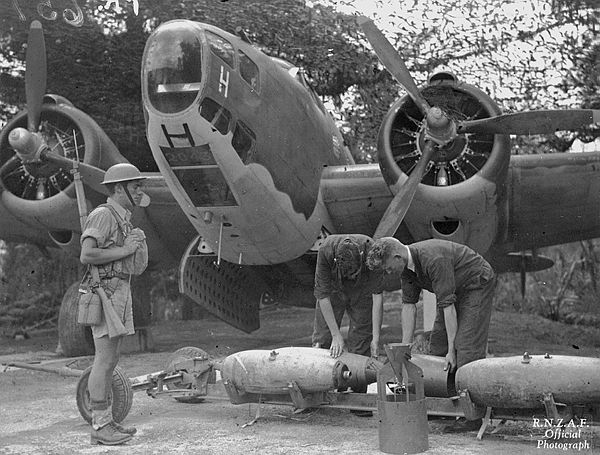
A Lockheed Hudson of No. 1 Squadron being loaded up with bombs

== Wartime commanding officers ==
The following were commanders of the squadron during its wartime service:

- Squadron Leader Geoffrey Newland Roberts May 1940 – August 1941
- Squadron Leader G.H. Fisher August 1941 – July 1942
- Squadron Leader F.J. Lucas July–December 1942
- Squadron Leader C.L. Monckton December 1942 – March 1943
- Squadron Leader E.W. Tacon March–May 1943
- Squadron Leader H.C. Walker May 1943 – April 1944
- Squadron Leader K.C. King April–July 1944
- Wing Commander A.N. Johnstone August 1944 – January 1945
- Wing Commander A.A.N. Breckon February–June 1945

== Commanding officers - after reactivation ==
- Squadron Leader P.R. Adamson – August 1972
- Squadron Leader C.F.L. Jenks – December 1973
- Squadron Leader G.A. Oldfield – April 1976
- Squadron Leader R.S. Holdaway - August 1976
- Squadron Leader G.A. Oldfield – February 1977
- Squadron Leader I.J. Roberts - July 1977
- Squadron Leader K.A. Skilling - September 1977
- Squadron Leader R.S. Holdaway - February 1978
- Squadron Leader K.J. Wells DFC - January 1980
- Squadron Leader I.W. Collins - January 1982
- Squadron Leader K.L. Crofskey - July 1984
