= No. 4 Squadron RNZAF =

- Active: 1940–1945, 1948-1957
- Country: New Zealand
- Branch: Royal New Zealand Air Force
- Role: Patrol Bomber - 1940-1945; Training - 1948-1957
- Size: One Squadron
- Garrison/HQ: RNZAF Base Whenuapai
- Motto: Always attack
- Anniversaries: October 1940
- Equipment: Lockheed Ventura; North American P-51 Mustang
- Engagements: World War II

Insignia
- Squadron Badge: Scottish dirks with a Maori greenstone mere

No. 4 Squadron RNZAF was a Royal New Zealand Air Force (RNZAF) patrol bomber unit that served in the South Pacific during World War II.

In the 1950s it also served as a Territorial Air Force unit flying Harvards and Mustangs from Taieri in Otago.

== History ==
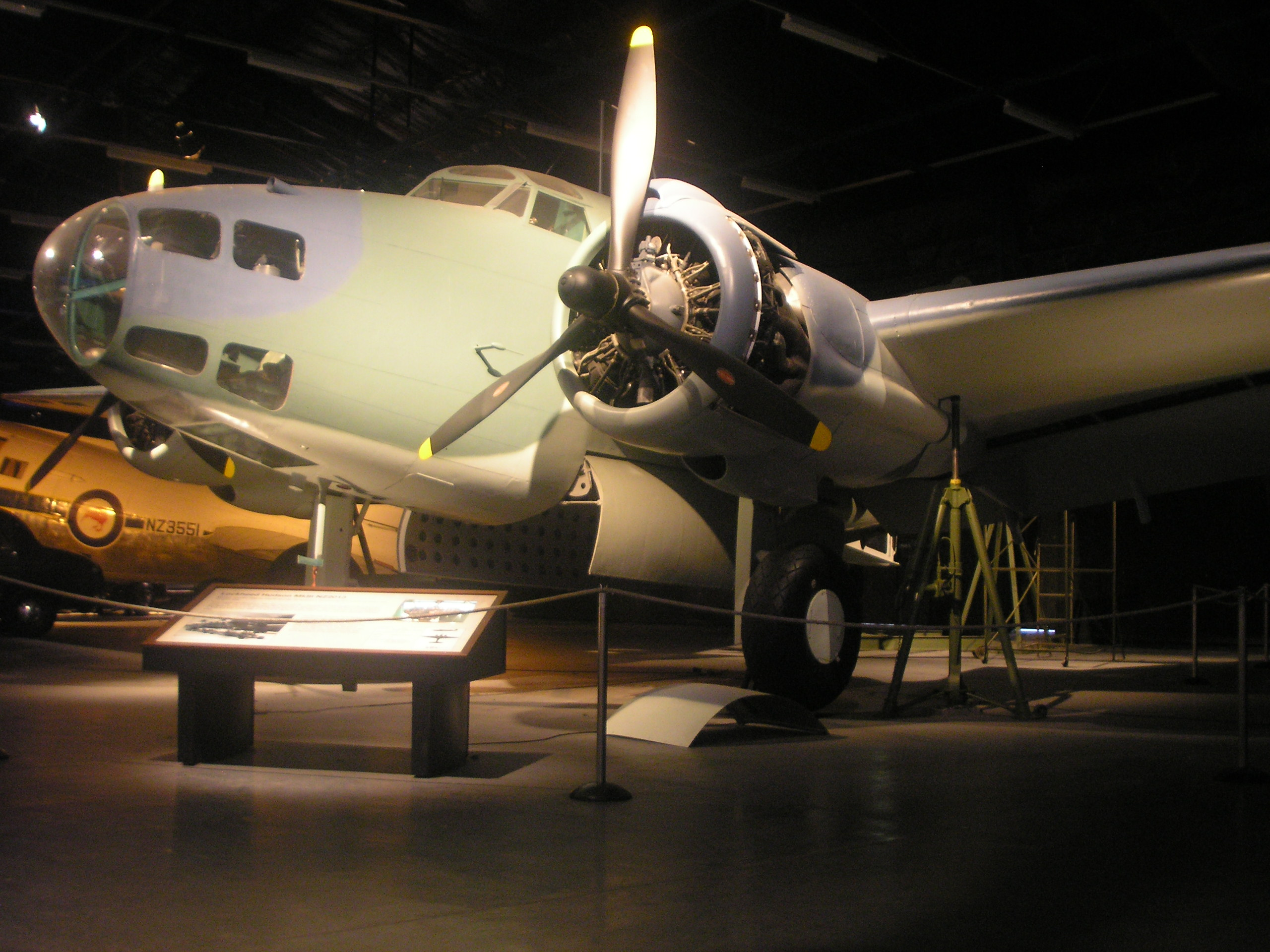
Hudson in the Royal New Zealand Air Force Museum.

=== Creation ===
Due to activity by German surface raiders, the squadron was hurriedly formed in Fiji in October 1940. The squadron was equipped with a range of converted civilian airliners, the twin-engined de Havilland DH.89 Dragon Rapide, and four engined de Havilland DH86 Express from Union Airways of New Zealand and de Havilland DH.60 Moth single-engined machines from aero clubs – New Zealand's modern Vickers Wellington bombers having been offered to the British Royal Air Force for the war in Europe, two years previously.

=== Commanding officers ===
Squadron Leader G R White was the first commanding officer and stayed with the squadron until October 1942. He was replaced by Wing Commander B M Lewis who served with the squadron until May 1943. Squadron Leader Ernest Tacon replaced him and was in command until December 1943. He in turn was replaced by Squadron Leader E Brooke-Taylor until April 1944, Squadron Leader N R Lecher until January 1945, Wing Commander F R Dix until February, Squadron Leader A F A Tye until June, and Squadron Leader L H Parry until August. The final commanding officer was Squadron Leader G S A Stevenson until the unit was disbanded in September 1945 at Los Negros.

=== Tours of duty and aircraft ===
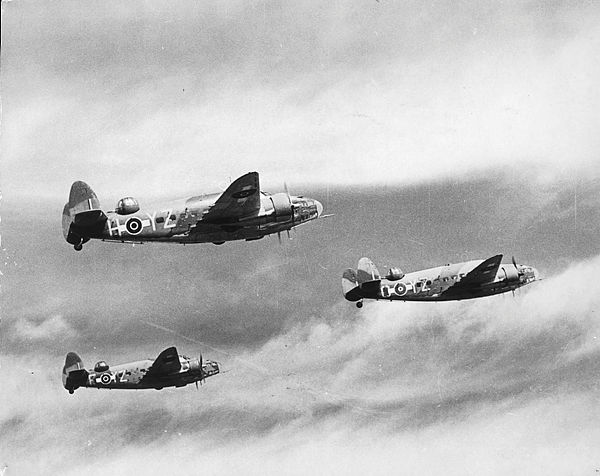
Three Lockheed Hudsons of No. 4 Squadron in flight near Fiji, 1944

The squadron was initially based in Fiji assisting No. 5 Squadron RNZAF. It took over obsolescent Vickers Vincent biplane torpedo bombers and later re-equipped with modern Lockheed Hudsons. When war with Japan broke out in December 1941 the Squadron remained in Fiji operating as a reconnaissance unit, and also for training crews to reinforce units in the forward area.

The squadron re-equipped with Lockheed Venturas in 1944. In November it shifted base to Emirau, remaining there until February 1945 when it moved to Guadalcanal from May 1945 to June 1945 and Emirau again in June and July of that year before moving to Los Negros where it remained when the war ended, disbanding in September 1945.

=== Action ===
In May 1943 three American liberty ships, the William Williams, Hearst and Vanderbilt, were torpedoed by Japanese submarines. Hudsons of No. 4 Squadron found the survivors of the Hurst and dropped supplies, as well as maintaining an anti-submarine patrol over the crippled William Williams as she was towed 120 miles north to Suva.

On 25 May a squadron machine sighted a surfaced submarine while escorting an American convoy and dropped four depth charges. An oil slick appeared – after the war it emerged a Japanese submarine was lost at this time in the area.

On 7 September a squadron Hudson damaged a second submarine while escorting the American ship Saugatuck. 5 other sightings and attacks were made by the squadron without result.

=== Missing aircraft ===
On 27 June 1943 Hudson NZ2025 went missing while on an anti submarine patrol. The crew were Flying Officer Tane Parata, Sergeant Albert Moss, Warrant Officer Egbert Willis, Flight Sergeant George Billson, and Sgt Michael Horgan. The patrol had been hastily prepared by Squadron Operations following a report of a Japanese submarine stalking a supply ship north west of Viti Levu. During the patrol the crew encountered bad weather and electrical interference that caused navigation problems. The aircraft ran out of fuel and ditched in the sea without a position fix. Subsequent searches failed to find any trace of the aircraft or crew who were posted Missing in Action - believed killed. The subsequent investigation and highly critical report by the RNZAF Staff Officer Navigation led to changes in mission planning and application of navigational aids and procedures.

On 20 August 1944 seven of the Lockheed Hudsons, which had just been replaced by Lockheed Venturas, were flown back to New Zealand from Nausori, Fiji. During the flight heavy weather was encountered and in accordance with normal practice the flight broke up. Two of the planes disappeared and were never seen again. An extensive search was carried out over the next few days by 12 long range aircraft from RNZAF Base Whenuapai near Auckland, but no sightings were made in the area where they were presumed to have gone missing. No distress signals were received either.

There were 14 men on board the two aircraft. They were Flight Lieutenant Wilbur Lange, Pilot Officer Kenneth Alexander Ross (a former Wellington table tennis champion), Flying Officer Sydney Philip Aldridge, Flying Officer Jack Andrew Olsen, Pilot Officer Kenneth Brian Marshall, Flying Officer David Oliphant Stewart, Sergeant George Arthur Bryant, Flying Officer Norman Kitchener Baird, Sergeant Robert Bruce Gillespie, Warrant Officer Arthur Francis Dunstan, Sergeant Thomas Bryan Carey, Pilot Officer Ivan Russell Johnson, Flight Sergeant Thomas' Hartley Ward, and Flying Officer John Thomson Waugh.

Flying Officer Waugh was the former Private Secretary for the Hon Bob Semple. He was employed in a Minister's office when he was still in his teens having joined the Public Service as a cadet. After working in the office of the Public Service Commissioner he joined Sir James Allen, Minister of Defence's staff. After World War One he became private secretary for Sir Maui Pomare. His appointments included several Ministers of the Crown, including the Prime Minister Peter Fraser.

=== Territorial Air Force ===
The Territorial Air Force was reformed in 1948 with four squadrons: 1 (Auckland), 2 (Wellington), 3 (Canterbury), and 4 (Otago). Their first aircraft were Tiger Moths and Harvards. In June 1952 the squadrons were allocated five Mustangs and three Harvards. The squadron aircraft were identified by a chequerboard pattern on either side of the fuselage roundel. Number 4 (Otago) Squadron's was blue and yellow. The colours corresponded to the colours of the Otago rugby team. The Squadron's Mustangs were withdrawn from service in May 1955 and the squadron on 31 July 1957.

== Aircraft ==
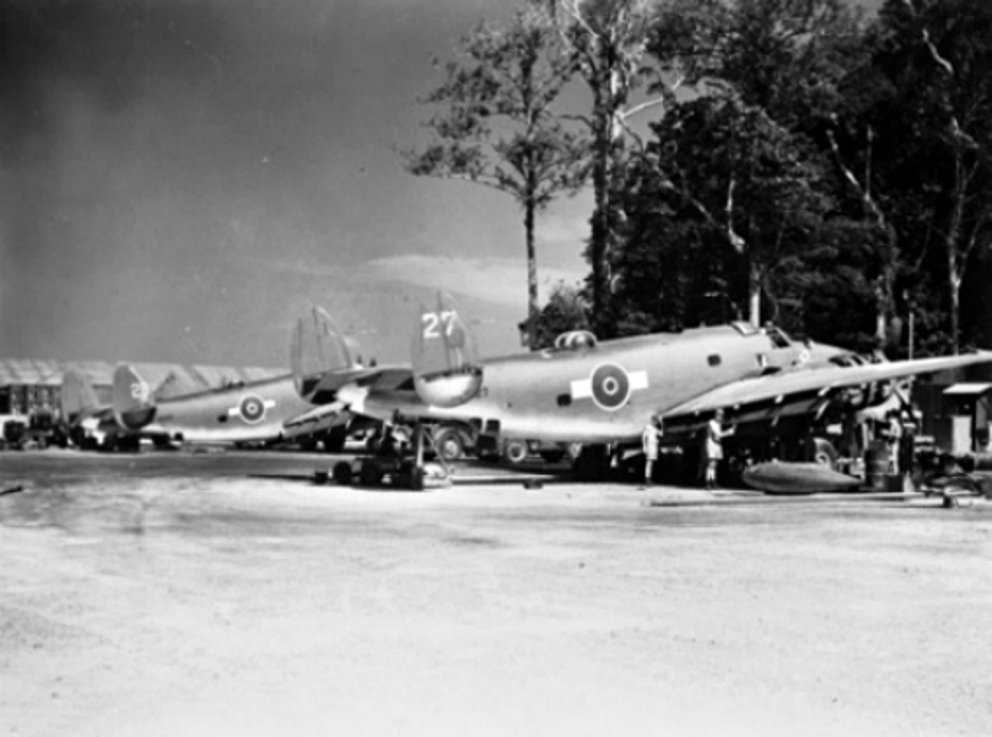

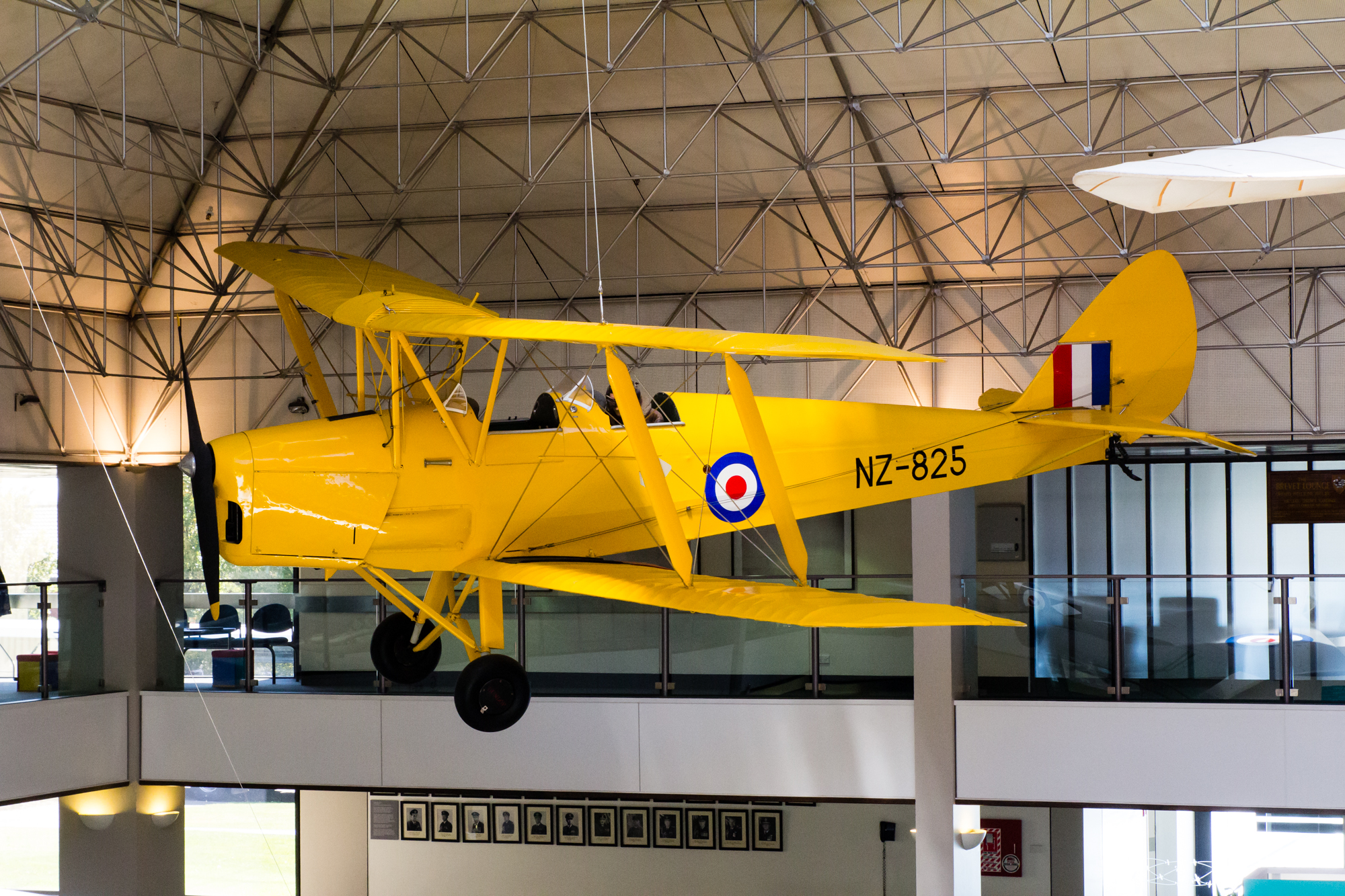

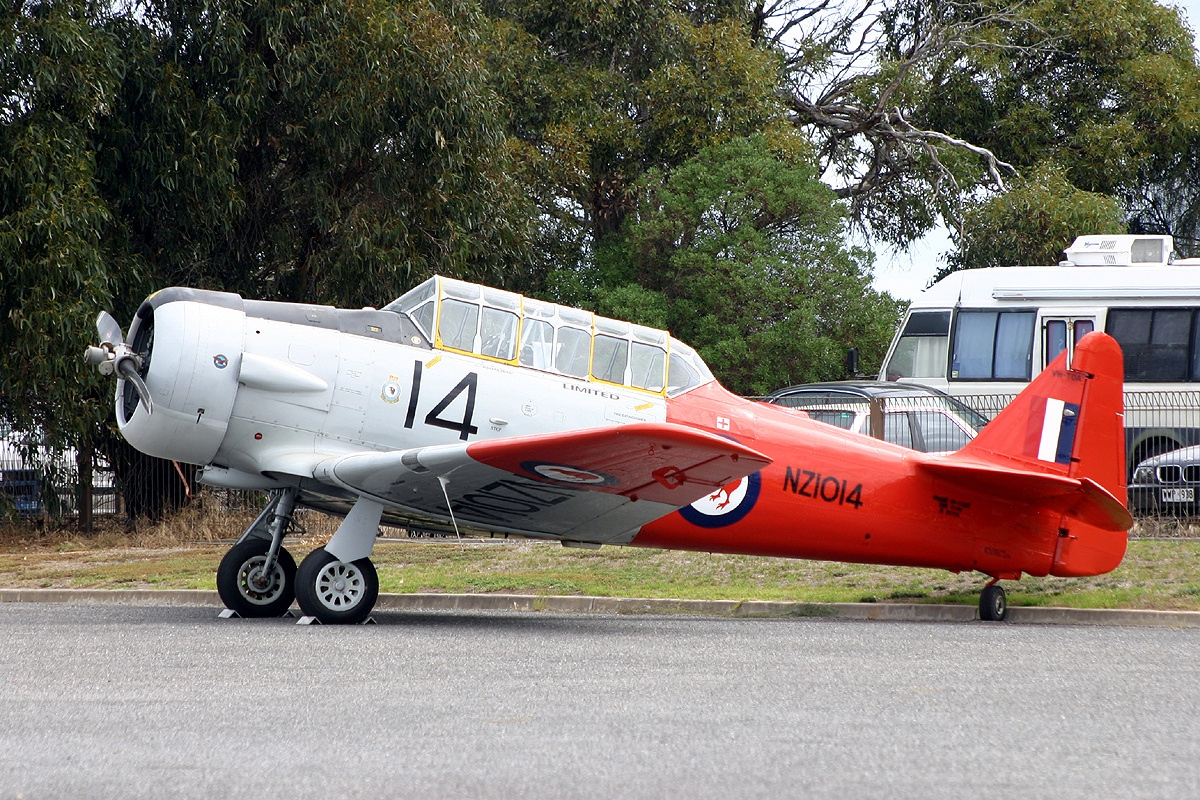

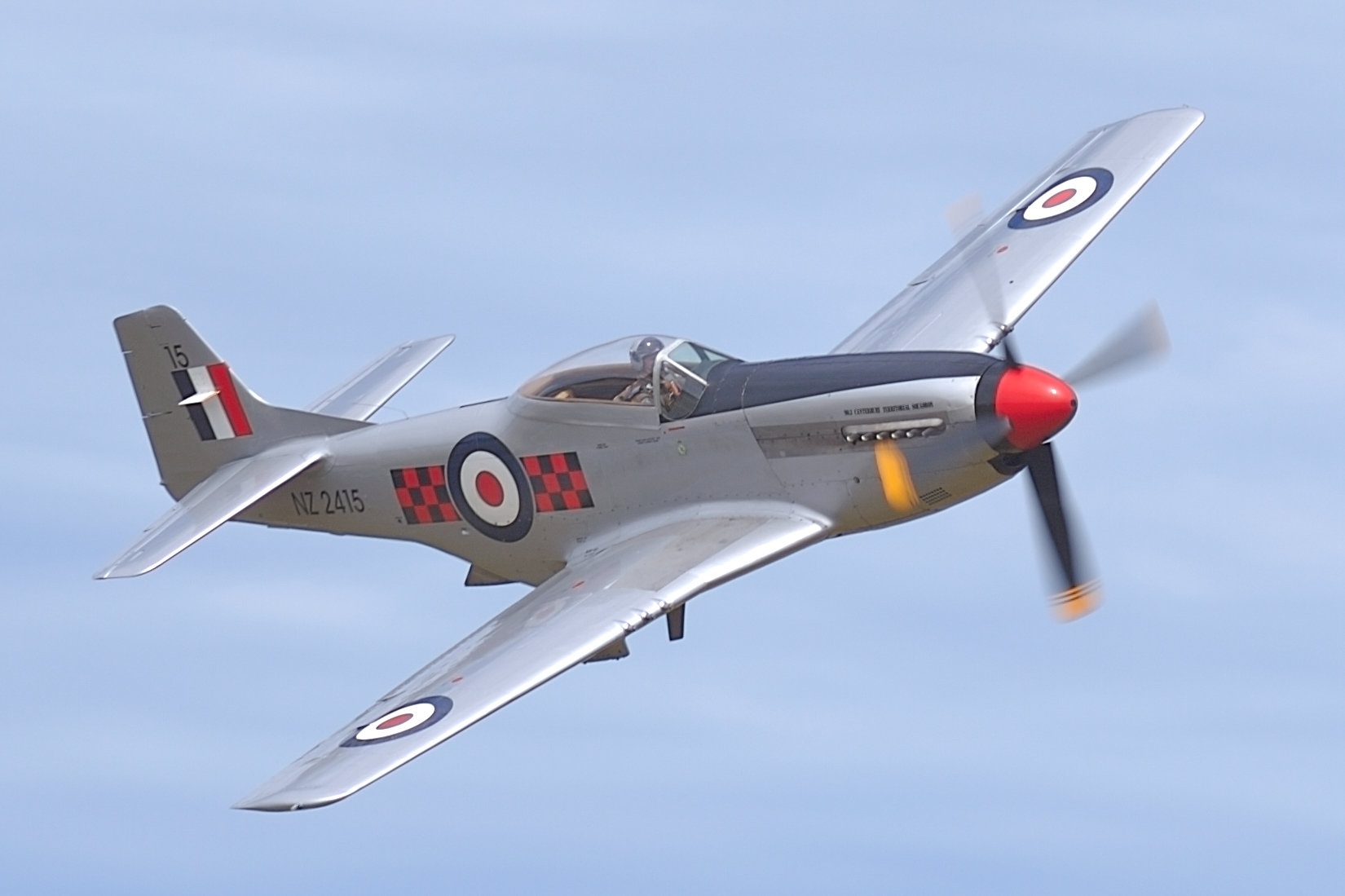

=== 1940 ===
- de Havilland DH.89 Dragon Rapide
- de Havilland DH86 Express from Union Airways of New Zealand
- de Havilland DH.60 Moth

=== 1941 ===
- Vickers Vincent from No.5 Squadron
- Lockheed Hudson replaced the Vincent

=== 1944 ===
- Lockheed Ventura till 1945

=== 1948 ===
- de Havilland Tiger Moth
- North American T-6 Texan till 1957

=== 1952 ===
- North American P-51 Mustang till 1957

== Surviving aircraft ==
A Lockheed Hudson that served with the squadron is preserved in squadron colours at the Royal New Zealand Air Force Museum, after being bought from a farmer who had been using it as a chicken coop.

== Commanding officers ==
Formed as No. 4 (Army Co-operation) Squadron

- Sqn Ldr P. K. Fowler (Aug 1930-Mar 1932)
- Sqn Ldr T. W. White (Mar 1932-Sept 1938)

Squadron personnel posted to Unattached List. The Squadron was reformed in Fiji on the 8th of October 1941 as No 4 (General Reconnaissance) Squadron

- Sqn Ldr G. R. White (Oct 1941-Nov 1942)
- Sqn Ldr H. C. Walker (Nov 1942-Jan 1943)
- Wg Cdr E. M. Lewis (Jan 1943-May 1943)
- Sqn Ldr E. W. Tacon, DFC, AFC (RAF)-(May 1943-Nov 1943)
- Sqn Ldr E. Brooke-Taylor (Nov 1943-Apr 1944)
- Sqn Ldr N. R. Lecher (Apr 1944-Jan 1945)
- Wg Cdr F. R. Dix (Jan 1945-Mar 1945)
- Wg Cdr A. F. H. Tye, DFC (Mar 1945-Jul 1945)
- Wg Cdr L. H. Parry (Jul 1945-Sep 1945)
- Sqn Ldr G. S. A. Stevenson (Sep 1945)

Squadron disbanded later reformed in Dunedin 1st December 1948 as No. 4 (Otago) Territorial Squadron

- Sqn Ldr W. R. Kofoed, DSO, DFC (Dec 1948-Dec 1950)
- Sqn Ldr J. R. Day, MBE, AFC (Dec 1950-Dec 1952)
- Sqn Ldr G. C. N. Johnson (Dec 1952-Jan 1953)
- Sqn Ldr J. R. Day, MBE, AFC (Dec 1953-Jun 1954)
- Sqn Ldr N. B. Collins (Jun 1954-Aug 1957)

Squadron was disbanded on the 1st of August 1957
