= Ernest Tacon =

New Zealand officer in the Royal Air Force

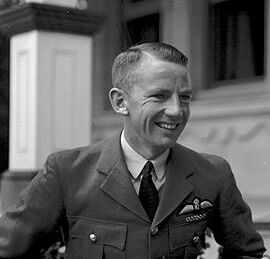
- Born: 16 December 1917; Napier, New Zealand
- Died: 9 January 2003 (aged 85); Auckland, New Zealand
- Military career
- Allegiance: New Zealand
- Branch: Royal Air Force; Royal New Zealand Air Force
- Rank: Air Commodore
- Nickname: 'Bill'
- Commands: No. 1 Squadron (RNZAF); No. 4 Squadron (RNZAF); No. 236 Squadron; No. 231 Squadron; King's Flight; Central Fighter Establishment
- Conflicts: Second World War: Norwegian campaign
- Awards: Commander of the Order of the British Empire; Member of the Royal Victorian Order; Distinguished Service Order; Distinguished Flying Cross & Bar; Air Force Cross & Bar

Ernest Tacon, CBE, MVO, DSO, DFC & Bar, AFC & Bar (16 December 1917 – 9 January 2003) was a highly decorated New Zealand officer who served in the Royal Air Force's Coastal Command during the Second World War.

From Napier, Tacon joined the Royal New Zealand Air Force (RNZAF) in 1937 but subsequently gained a short service commission in the Royal Air Force (RAF). Serving with No. 233 Squadron at the start of the Second World War, he flew Lockheed Hudson light bombers during the campaign in Norway in 1940 and was awarded the Distinguished Flying Cross (DFC). The following year he assisted in the training of pilots of the Canadian No. 407 Squadron, flying several operational sorties towards the end of the year. His work with the squadron was recognised with an award of the Air Force Cross. Loaned to the RNZAF in late 1942, he commanded two squadrons in New Zealand and Fiji respectively for a number of months. Returning to RAF service in 1944, he was appointed commander of the Bristol Beaufighter-equipped No. 236 Squadron, and led it in several anti-shipping operations along the English Channel and in the Bay of Biscay. His work led to him being awarded a Bar to his DFC and the Distinguished Service Order. He was shot down in September 1944 and spent the remainder of the war as a prisoner of war.

In the postwar period, Tacon was granted a permanent commission in the RAF. He served as commander of the King's Flight on its reestablishment in 1946 and his work in this regard led to his appointment to the Royal Victorian Order. He held training and command posts for much of the remainder of his service in the RAF. He retired from military service in 1971 as a Commander of the Order of the British Empire and holding the rank of air commodore. He returned to New Zealand where he worked as an executive for the Society for Intellectually Handicapped Children. He died in Auckland in 2003 at the age of 85.

== Early life ==
Ernest William Tacon was born in Napier, New Zealand, on 16 December 1917. He was educated at Hastings Boys' High School for a year but following the earthquake that struck the Hawke’s Bay region in 1931, he transferred to St Patrick's College in Upper Hutt. On completing his education, he worked for the Railways Department in Hastings. He learnt to fly at the Hawke's Bay-East Coast Aero Club. He joined the Royal New Zealand Air Force (RNZAF) in November 1937 but eighteen months later transferred to the Royal Air Force (RAF) as a pilot officer on a short service commission.

== Second World War ==
On the outbreak of the Second World War, Tacon was serving with Coastal Command's No. 233 Squadron which was equipped with Lockheed Hudson light bombers. The squadron was involved in the Norwegian campaign that commenced in April 1940, with Tacon flying several reconnaissance sorties. On one of these, carried out on 9 April, he engaged and damaged a Heinkel He 115 floatplane near Bergen. On others he searched for the German ships Scharnhorst and Admiral Scheer. Although he failed to find the vessels, he did locate and attack anti-aircraft ships. In recognition of his exploits during the campaign, Tacon was awarded the Distinguished Flying Cross (DFC). He was promoted to flying officer three months later.

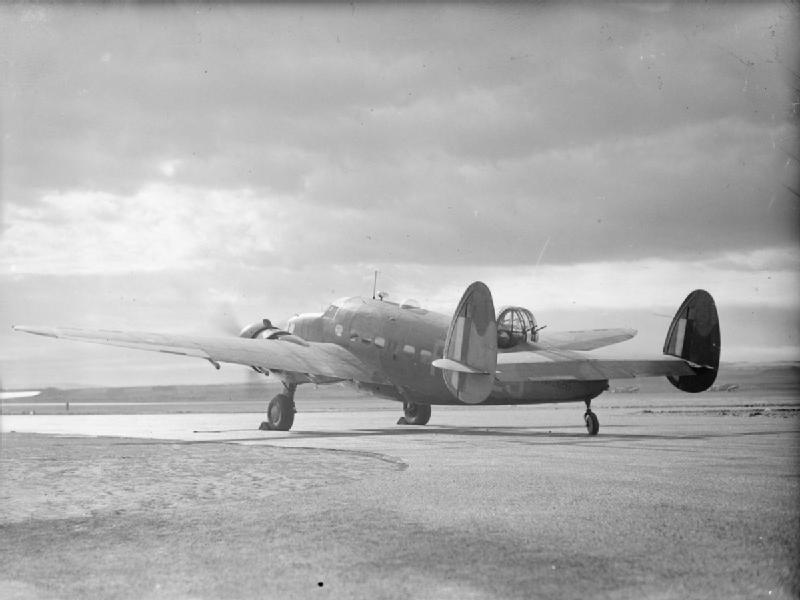
Lockheed Hudson of No. 233 Squadron at Leuchars

=== Training duties ===
In early 1941, Tacon was involved in ferrying aircraft, such as Hudsons and Boeing B-17 Flying Fortresses, from North America back to the United Kingdom. Later in the year he was posted to No. 407 Squadron, a newly formed unit of the Royal Canadian Air Force. He assisted in the familiarisation of much of the flying personnel, who were mostly recently qualified pilots, on the Hudson aircraft that equipped the squadron as well as working towards bringing it towards operational status. He subsequently flew bombing sorties with the squadron to German-occupied Europe. The following year he was an instructor at an Operational Training Unit in Canada. In recognition of his training work, he was awarded the Air Force Cross (AFC) in the King's Birthday Honours of 1942.

In late 1942, Tacon was loaned to the RNZAF and returned to New Zealand. There he commanded No. 1 Squadron, a bomber reconnaissance unit equipped with Hudsons, from March to May 1943, and was then appointed commander of No. 4 Squadron, another bomber unit but based in Fiji, as it converted from Hudsons to Lockheed Ventura medium bombers.

=== Anti-shipping campaign ===
Tacon's loan period ended in January 1944 and he returned to the United Kingdom and service with the RAF. By this time he held the rank of squadron leader. In mid-1944 Tacon, who was known as 'Bill', was appointed commander of No. 236 Squadron. Equipped with Bristol Beaufighter heavy fighters, it was part of Coastal Command's anti-shipping campaign along the English Channel and in the Bay of Biscay. On one sortie in June, he attacked a convoy of minesweepers as they entered Boulogne harbour near Calais, damaging four of them. This action to him being awarded a Bar to his DFC. On 24 August, he led a sortie to the harbour at Le Verdon, where the German destroyer Z24 and a torpedo boat were attacked and damaged to such an extent that they subsequently sank.

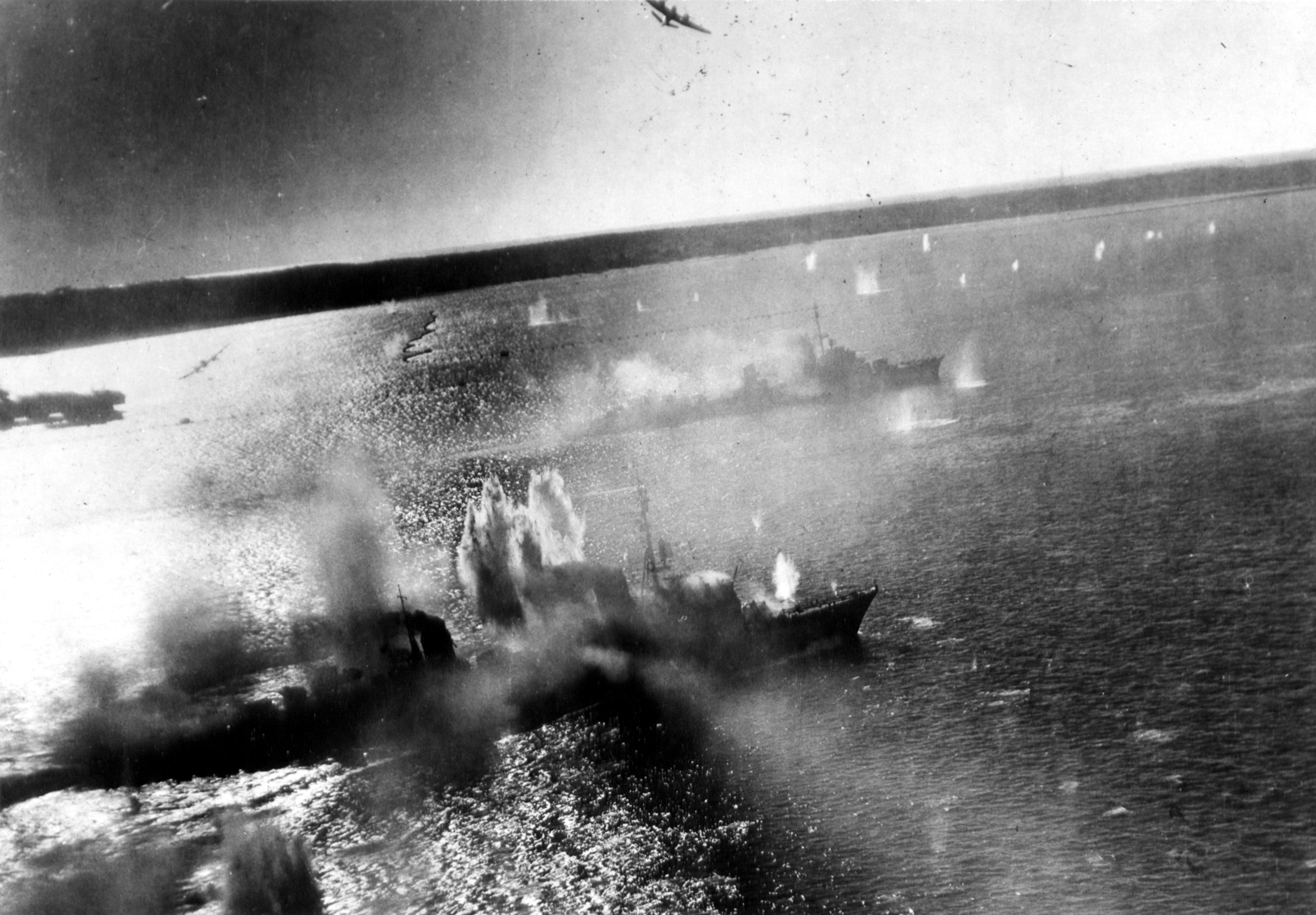
The German destroyer Z24 and a torpedo boat under attack at Le Verdon harbour by Bristol Beaufighters of Tacon's squadron, 24 August 1944

On 12 September, Tacon was leading the North Coates and Anzac Strike Wings, totalling near forty Beaufighters, in an attack on the Dutch port of Den Helder when his aircraft was struck by anti-aircraft fire and exploded. Despite being burnt, he was able to bale out to become a prisoner of war (POW) but his navigator was killed. Tacon, who was initially reported as missing in action before the Germans confirmed his POW status, spent most of his captivity in Stalag Luft I in northern Germany. In the interim, he was awarded a Distinguished Service Order (DSO) for his leadership of the sortie to Le Verdon back in August. The citation, published in the London Gazette, read:

In August, 1944, Wing Commander Tacon led a force of aircraft in an attack on the harbour of Le Verdon. A very heavy barrage of anti-aircraft fire from the enemy ships and ground defences was encountered and after the attack four of our aircraft were severely damaged. Wing Commander Tacon directed one aircraft to alight on the sea near a naval force in the vicinity and then proceeded to an advanced base in France where he supervised the landing of the remaining three aircraft. He displayed outstanding qualities of resourceful leadership and great devotion to duty. Two destroyers were set on fire and seriously damaged during this action.

— London Gazette, No. 36750, 17 October 1944

Once the advancing Soviet Army reached his camp at the end of the war in Europe, Tacon was repatriated back to England. It was only then that he found out that he had been awarded the DSO.

== Postwar career ==
In the immediate postwar period, Tacon was commander of No. 231 Squadron, a Transport Command unit which operated the Avro Lancastrian, an air transport that had been converted from the Avro Lancaster heavy bomber, until January 1946. His short service commission in the RAF was relinquished the following March and Tacon transferred to the RNZAF although remained in RAF service. He was subsequently granted a permanent commission in the RAF the following year as a squadron leader.

In the interim, Tacon was selected to become commander of the King's Flight, which was composed of four Vickers Viking aircraft. He was the pilot of the aircraft carrying King George VI during the Royal Family's tour of Southern Africa in 1947. That year, in the 1946 King's Birthday Honours, Tacon was appointed to the Royal Victorian Order for "services in connection with Their Majesties' visit to the Union of South Africa, Southern Rhodesia and other territories in Africa". He continued to serve in the King's Flight until 1950 and two years later was promoted to wing commander.

Tacon was awarded a Bar to his AFC on the occasion of the Queen's Birthday in 1954. During the later stages of the Suez Crisis, he was the air officer commanding on Cyprus and remained in this post until 1959. In that year's Queen's Birthday Honours, Tacon was appointed a Commander of the Order of the British Empire. He was a senior instructor at the School of Land/Air Warfare at Old Sarum before, in 1963, becoming the commandant of the Central Fighter Establishment at Binbrook. His last post before his retirement from the RAF in February 1971 as an air commodore was air officer commander of military air traffic operations.

== Later life ==
Returning to New Zealand with his family, Tacon worked as an executive for the Society for Intellectually Handicapped Children. He was also an advocate for animals affected by the Aswan Dam project in Egypt. He died on 9 September 2003 in Auckland, survived by his wife and six children.
