= Territorial Air Force (New Zealand) =

Volunteer air force

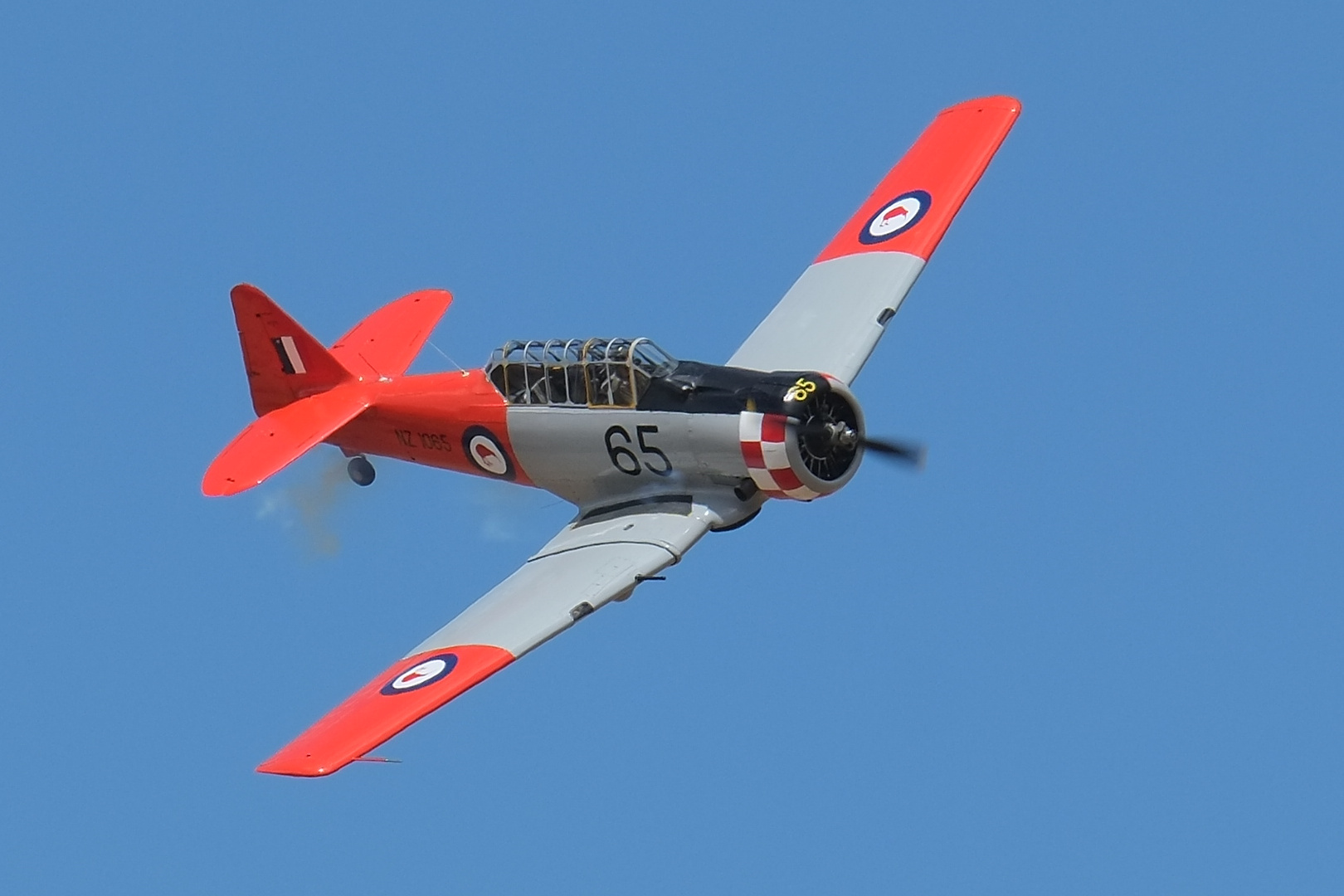
- A North American Harvard as flown by the Territorial Air Force
- Founded: 1930
- Current form: 1957
- Headquarters: Wellington, New Zealand

Personnel
- Active personnel: 72 (1923), 341 (1939)

The Territorial Air Force, or TAF, is a reserve air force that operates in New Zealand. The service traces its lineage back to a 1919 report that proposed an air force for the country manned by part-time volunteers, with the first recruits arriving in 1923. However, it was not until 1930 that the Territorial Air Force was formally constituted. The pilots had all previously served with the Royal Air Force, many in the First World War. Structurally, the force consisted of a wing of four squadrons, each allocated to one of the major cities of the country, with major sites at Auckland, Christchurch, Dunedin and Wellington. The Territorial Air Force suffered from a lack of equipment, particularly aircraft, throughout its existence. Initially, it relied on aircraft operated by the New Zealand Permanent Air Force, including obsolete examples that had been provided as part of the Imperial Gift, until a batch of second-hand Blackburn Baffin were purchased to provide both training and combat service. The Territorial Air Force was absorbed into the Royal New Zealand Air Force with the start of the Second World War. At the end of the war, an expanded network was originally envisaged, but the revived version of 1948 retained its structure of four squadrons. The TAF's flying squadron lasted only another nine years before the force was reduced to providing non-flying personnel like air traffic controllers and band members.

== History ==
The roots of the New Zealand Territorial Air Force lay with a report written by Group Captain Bettington of the Royal Air Force written in June 1919. The report was pessimistic about the possibility of a long-lasting peace after the Armistice of 11 November 1918, despite the imminent Treaty of Versailles. It envisaged a Territorial Air Force of 174 officers and 1,060 other ranks, to be built up over eight years. The force was to consist of volunteers who would work part-time in the Territorial Air Force, mirroring the existing Territorial Force of the New Zealand Military Forces, supported by a smaller nucleus of full-time officers who would form the complementary New Zealand Permanent Air Force. However, it was not until 1923 that the first 72 officers were recruited. All had previously served in the First World War with the Royal Air Force and started to receive their refresher training in 1924. By 1927, this had increased to 101. However, insufficient available aircraft meant that actual flying time was limited and within two years the force had diminished to nonviable levels.

=== Initial incarnation ===
What was required was a more formal structure and, in August 1930, the Territorial Air Force, or TAF, was formed, based on squadrons of aircraft led by permanent staff. It was not until 1934 that the first aircraft dedicated to the Territorial Air Force were made available, initially transferred from New Zealand Permanent Air Force stocks. It was also in 1934 that the Permanent Air Force was renamed the Royal New Zealand Air Force or RNZAF, although the TAF remained in the New Zealand Air Force. Despite this, the TAF remained essentially a paper force until the arrival of twelve second-hand aircraft from Britain in 1937. These aircraft were based at the aerodrome outside Wellington, and were accompanied by an additional three that acted as spares. The choice of second-hand examples was for financial prudence, although low hour airframes were chosen to ensure the aircraft could operate for a reasonable time in service.

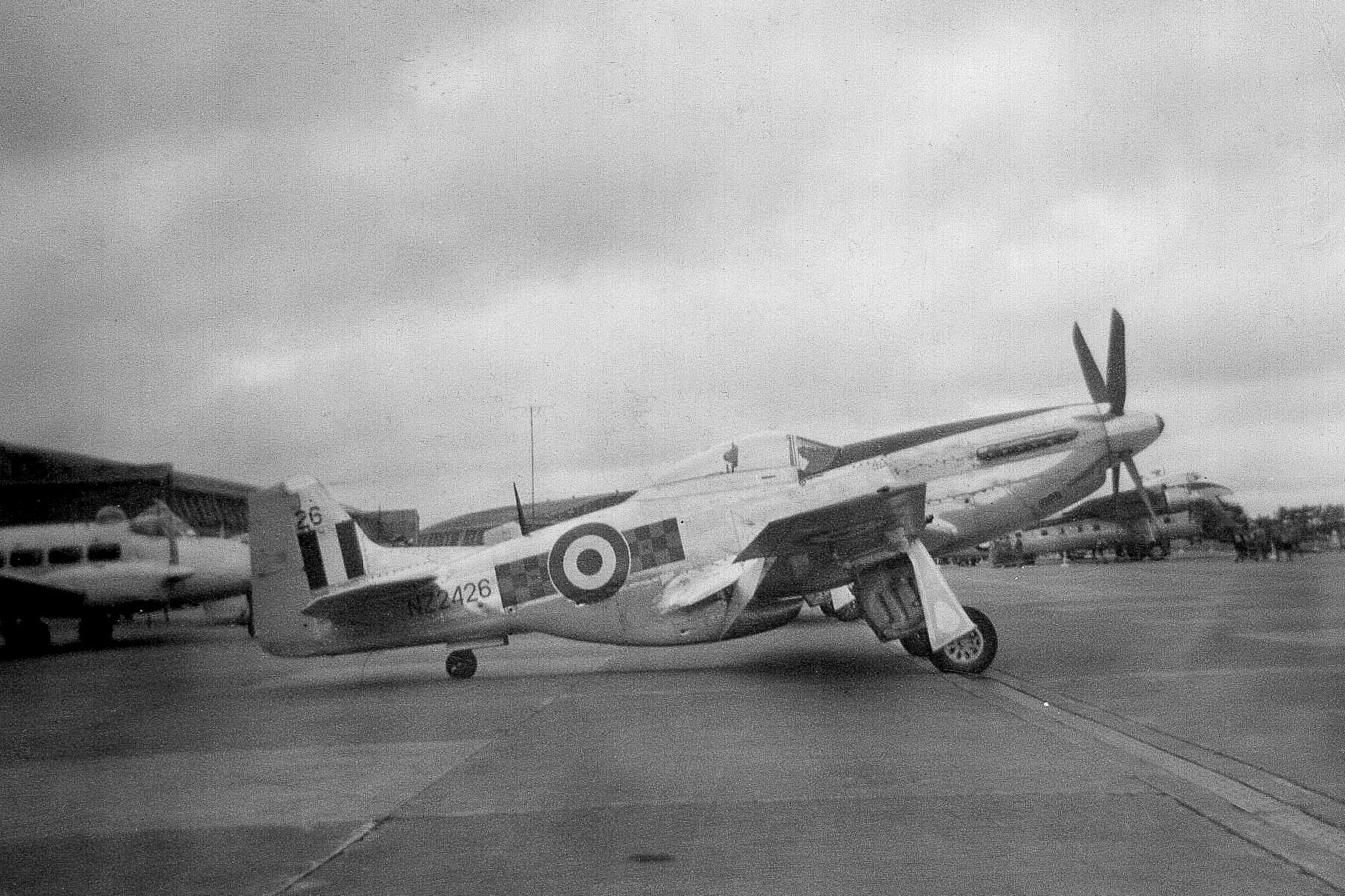
P-51D Mustang NZ2426, from the Wellington Squadron, at RNZAF Ohakea, 1956.

Expansion then was rapid. In the run up to the Second World War, the Air Board utilised the Territorial Air Force as a channel to increase the intake of pilots, particularly taking those already involved in civil aviation and members of aero clubs. An Auckland Territorial Squadron based at Hobsonville was founded in June 1938 and the first aircraft arrived at Wigram to serve the unit at Christchurch in the following September. By March 1939, the TAF included 18 officers and 96 airmen based in Wellington, 17 and 92 respectively in Christchurch and 20 and 77 based in Auckland. A fourth squadron, at Dunedin, was authorised at the same time but did not yet exist. With the declaration of war on Germany by the United Kingdom, which due to an existing treaty meant that New Zealand was also at war, the Territorial Air Force was fully mobilised. The Auckland and Christchurch squadrons started training almost immediately, the latter particularly including anti-submarine warfare in its regime. The Wellington Squadron moved to a new aerodrome at Blenheim three days later to do the same. Discussions were had in April 1939 about expanding this further. Instead, the units was absorbed into the regular air force, the RNZAF, and the personnel moved to active roles.

=== Post-war revival ===
Towards the end of the war, the future of the Territorial Air Force was discussed and, in 1945, Air Commodore Arthur Neville produced a report recommending a large network of Territorial Air Force stations across the country. In December 1948, the TAF was revived with four squadrons of training aircraft, based at Auckland, Canterbury, Otago and Wellington. The squadrons were later equipped with fighters which also performed ground attack duties. In 1952, a fifth squadron, numbered six, was added, equipped for maritime reconnaissance. Increasing financial pressure, and the reduction in the need for defence spending, meant that the flying squadrons of the TAF were disbanded on 31 July 1957.

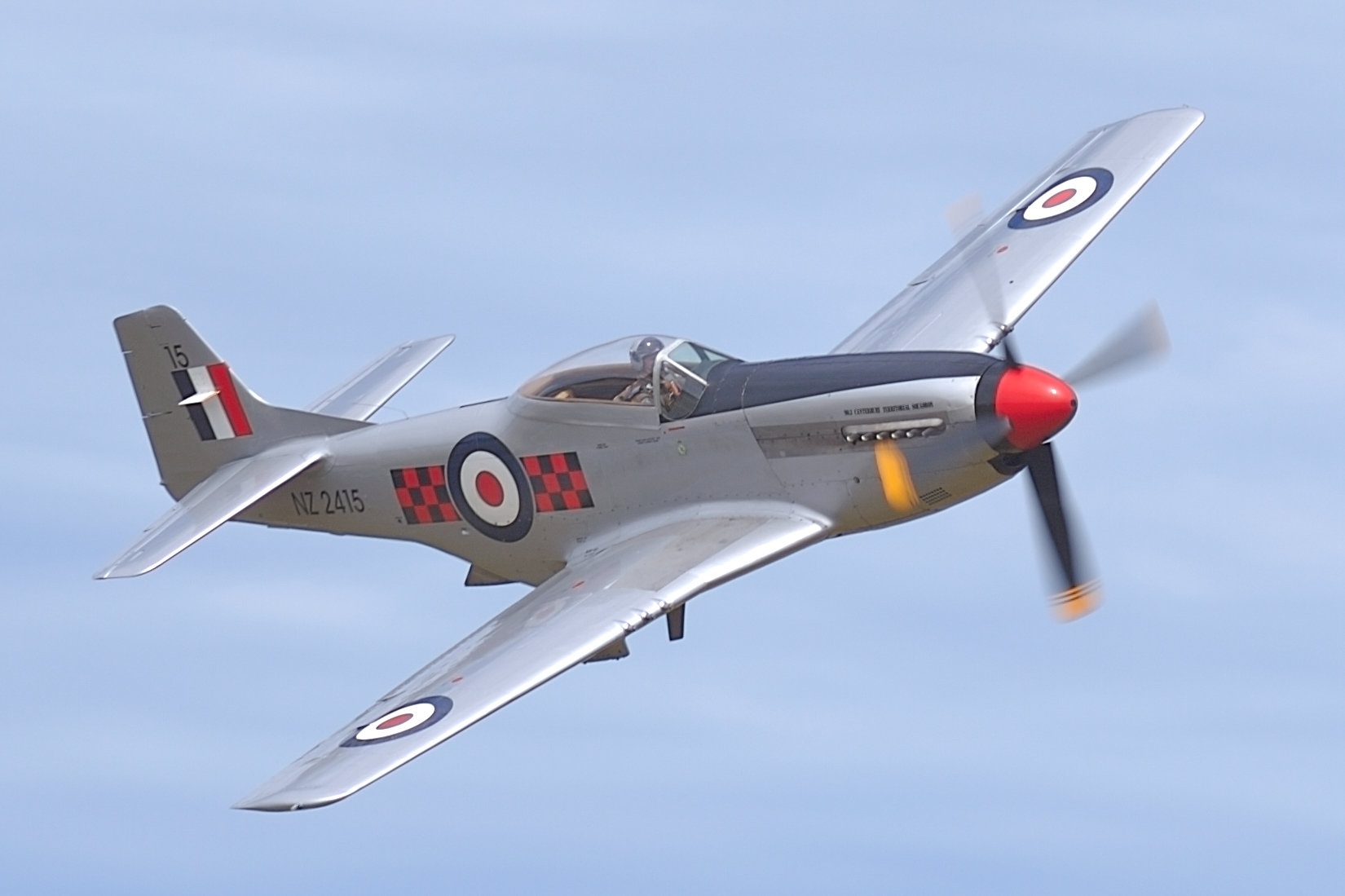
A North American P-51 Mustang in the markings of the TAF's Canterbury squadron

The Royal New Zealand Air Force retained a reserve unit after the TAF flying squadrons were disbanded. One key responsibility was to provide the musicians that formed the Air Force Band, a service that the TAF had performed since 1935 apart from a hiatus between 1940 and 1945. In 1982, the report of the Naval Board of the Defence Council for the period 1 April 1981 to 31 March 1982 wrote that "as in previous years the Territorial Air Force continued to provide for Air Traffic Control appointments and to man the RNZAF’s band." It also spoke of non-regular force squadrons that were to be established at each RNZAF base, which were never actually formed. In 1984, RNZAF reserve personnel included 201 territorial members, each of which served 7 weeks and 20 days a year. The band was one of only three military bands that were retained in 2012.

== Organisation ==
The New Zealand Territorial Air Force was constructed after the model of the Royal Air Force. The service consisted of squadrons each of twelve aircraft, subdivided into flights, supported by a pool of spares. As the primary role of the force was refresher training, an extensive programme was developed to provide a wide range of skills. Staff were given instruction in flying duties, theory of flight, rigging and aircraft-engines. They were also trained in the use of radios and weapons, including Lewis and Vickers machine guns.

The operational headquarters of the TAF was initially Wellington, although Christchurch soon became the hub for operations. The first recruits were trained alongside the Permanent Air Force, but part-time while travelling in from home. Ground crews who provided service or maintenance, non-commissioned officers and other ranks were trained independently at Christchurch Technical College.

As constituted in August 1930, the Territorial Air Force was a wing of four squadrons, each led by a permanent officer. A squadron was allocated to one of the major cities in New Zealand, with staff allocated generally to the one closest to where they lived. Ranks were changed to reflect practice in the Royal Air Force, rather than using the Army as a model. The initial strength was sixty officers from the previous incarnation and six cadets from aero clubs. Training took place at the Hobsonville and Wigram Aerodromes, although this was still restricted to pilots. By 1936, Hobsonville had sufficient facilities, including an engine repair shop, to provide the support needed by the fleet. Permanent maintenance staff, two non-commissioned officers, four fitters and four riggers, arrived in February 1939, shortly before the TAF was absorbed into the Royal New Zealand Air Force. Despite recommendations for further expansion, the 1948 incarnation of the Territorial Air Force was similarly based on a wing of initially four squadrons. Each squadron consisted of typically twelve aircraft.

== Aircraft ==
Image	Model	Variants	Origin	Role	Service period	Notes	Reference
A stationary monoplane	Auster Adventurer	J/5	UK	General purpose floatplane	1952–1957		
A stationary biplane	Blackburn Baffin	Baffin I	UK	Two-seat general reconnaissance biplane	1937–1939	The first aircraft used by the Air Force were twelve which came second-hand from the Fleet Air Arm in July 1937 at a cost of £200 each.	
A biplane in flight	de Havilland Tiger Moth	DH.82A, Mk II	UK; NZ	Two-seat elementary pilot trainer biplane	1948–1956		
	North American Harvard	Harvard Mk II, IIA, IIB, III	US	Two-seat advanced pilot trainer aircraft	1948–1957		
	North American Mustang	P-51D (Mustang Mk III)	US	Single-seat fighter bomber aircraft	1951–1955		
A flying boat in flight	Short Sunderland	Sunderland M.R.5	UK	Maritime reconnaissance flying boat	1952–1957		
A biplane in flight	Vickers Vildebeest	Vildebeest I	UK	Three-seat general reconnaissance biplane	1938–1939		

The first aircraft used by the Territorial Air Force were operated by the New Zealand Permanent Air Force. These included ex-Royal Air Force Airco DH.4s and DH.9 bombers and Bristol F.2 Fighters, that had served in the First World War and formed part of the Imperial Gift, as well as Avro 504K trainers.

== See also ==
- North American P-51 Mustang in New Zealand service
- Short Sunderland in New Zealand service
