= Taieri Aerodrome =

Airport in New Zealand

- IATA: none; ICAO: NZTI

Summary
- Airport type: Public
- Owner: Dunedin City Council
- Operator: Otago Aero Club
- Location: Mosgiel, Dunedin, New Zealand
- Elevation AMSL: 85 ft / 26 m
- Coordinates: 45°51′36″S 170°21′30″E
- Interactive map of Taieri Aerodrome

Runways
Direction	Length		Surface
Direction	ft	m	Surface
05/23	2,667	813	Grass
11	2,230	680	Grass
29	2,457	749	Grass

Taieri Aerodrome (ICAO: NZTI) is an aerodrome 2.7 NM (5 km) west of Dunedin, New Zealand.

== History ==
Taieri Aerodrome was the most southerly Royal New Zealand Air Force flying station during World War II. No. 1 Elementary Flying School, No. 307 Elementary Ground Training School and a flight which managed stored Lockheed Hudsons were located there.

== Present day ==
Taieri Aerodrome is home to the Otago Aero Club, New Zealand's oldest aero club, being established in 1927. In addition to being a social organisation, the aero club offers flying school. There are also a number of businesses that operate from the airfield, including those that specialise in maintenance and aircraft restoration. These include Supercraft Aircraft Support (GA aircraft maintenance provider, Southair Aviation (GA aircraft maintenance provider), Heliotago, Red1 Fabrication, Mark Smaill Aircraft Painter and Highland Helicopters.

The aerodrome is host to the popular biennial Wings & Wheels day, which sees a variety of aircraft and vintage cars on display.

== Operational information ==
Taieri has four grass runway vectors 05/23 and 11/29.

Avgas is available via Z Energy swipecard, east of northern end RWY 05 and Jet A1 is available from HeliOtago.

== See also ==
- List of airports in New Zealand
- List of airlines of New Zealand
- Transport in New Zealand
