= List of military units based in or affiliated with the South Island =

== Royal New Zealand Navy bases and ships of the South Island ==
- HMNZS Canterbury (L421) - Multi Role Vessel: 2007-
- HMNZS Hawea (2007) - Protector class inshore patrol vessel: 2007-
- HMNZS Otago (P148) - Protector Class Ocean Patrol Vessel: 2007-
- HMNZS Pegasus, RNZNVR Establishment, Christchurch
- HMNZS Pukaki (2008) - Protector class inshore patrol vessel: 2008-
- HMNZS Toroa, RNZNVR Establishment, Dunedin

=== Former Royal New Zealand Navy bases, ships and units of the South Island ===
- HMNZS Canterbury (F421) - Leander-class frigate: 1971–2005
- HMNZS Charles Upham (A02) - Military sealift ship: 1995–2000
- HMNZS Hautapu (T26) - Castle-class minesweeper: 1943–1947
- HMNZS Hawea (F422) - Loch-class frigate: 1948–1957
- HMNZS Kiwi (P3554) - Moa class patrol boat: 1984–2007
- HMNZS Lyttelton - Examination vessel: 1942–1944
- HMNZS Moa (P3553) - Moa class patrol boat: 1984–2007
- HMNZS Monowai (F59) - armed merchant cruiser and Landing Ship, Infantry: 1940–1943
- HMNZS Monowai (A06) - Hydrographic survey vessel: 1975–1997
- HMNZS Otago (F111) - Rothesay-class frigate: 1960–1983
- HMNZS Pukaki (F424) - Loch-class frigate: 1948–1966
- HMNZS Southland (F104) - Leander-class frigate: 1983–1997
- HMNZS Stina - Examination vessel: 1942–1944
- HMNZS Tasman - Training vessel: 1944–1946
- HMNZS Tasman - Former Naval Base at Lyttelton
- HMNZS Tuirangi - Examination vessel: 1942–1944
- HMNZS Waima (T33) - Castle-class minesweeper: 1943–1946
- HMNZS Wairangi - Examination vessel: 1940–1944
- 3rd Minesweeping Group, Royal New Zealand Navy

== Royal New Zealand Air Force bases and units of the South Island ==
- RNZAF Air Movements Harewood, Christchurch
- RNZAF Base Wigram, Christchurch
- RNZAF Base Woodbourne
- RNZAF Command Training School
- RNZAF Dip Flat, Nelson Lakes District
- RNZAF General Service Training School
- RNZAF Museum, Wigram, Christchurch

=== Former Royal New Zealand Air Force bases and units of the South Island ===
- RNZAF Addington
- RNZAF Cashmere
- RNZAF Darfield
- RNZAF Dillions Point
- RNZAF Eyreton (Harris Field)
- RNZAF Hillside, Dunedin
- RNZAF Lyttelton
- RNZAF Maronan
- RNZAF Mayfield
- RNZAF Milton
- RNZAF Momona
- RNZAF Outram
- RNZAF Station Ashburton
- RNZAF Station Birdlings Flat
- RNZAF Station Christchurch Central
- RNZAF Station Delta
- RNZAF Station Fairhall
- RNZAF Station Harwood
- RNZAF Station Norwood
- RNZAF Station Nelson
- RNZAF Station Omaka
- RNZAF Station Taieri
- RNZAF Station Te Pirita
- RNZAF Station Weedons
- RNZAF Waimakariri
- No. 1 Electrical and Wireless School
- No. 1 Elementary Flying Training School
- No. 1 Flying Training School RNZAF
- No. 1 Ground Training Depot
- No. 1 Repair Depot
- No. 1 Service Flying Training School RNZAF
- No. 2 Aircraft Storage Unit
- No. 2 Elementary Flying Training School
- No. 2 Service Flying Training School
- No. 2 Squadron RNZAF
- No. 3 Anti-Aircraft Co-operation Flight
- No. 3 Electrical and Wireless Training Squadron
- No. 3 Elementary Flying Training School
- No. 3 Repair Depot RNZAF
- No. 3 Squadron RNZAF
- No. 3 Stores Depot
- No. 3 Technical Training School
- No. 4 Squadron RNZAF
- No. 4 Technical Training Centre
- No. 10 Squadron RNZAF
- No. 11 Squadron RNZAF
- No. 12 Squadron RNZAF
- No. 16 Squadron RNZAF
- No. 18 Squadron RNZAF
- No. 21 Squadron RNZAF
- No. 22 Squadron RNZAF
- No. 31 Squadron RNZAF
- No. 32 Squadron RNZAF
- No. 41 Squadron RNZAF
- No. 43 Squadron RNZAF
- 311 Electrical and Wireless Squadron
- Administrative Training School
- Airframe Reconditioning Squadron RNZAF (RNZAF Base Woodbourne)
- Navigation and Air Electronics Training Squadron RNZAF
- Pilot Training Squadron RNZAF
- RNZAF Advanced Ground Training Squadron
- Central Flying School RNZAF (1945–1993)
- Elementary Ground Training Squadron
- RNZAF Ground Training Depot
- RNZAF Initial Training Wing
- RNZAF NCO's School
- RNZAF Officers' School of Instruction
- RNZAF School of General Reconnaissance
- RNZAF Southern Group Headquarters

== South Island bases and units of the New Zealand Army ==
- Burnham Army Camp
- Tekapo Army Training Area
- HQ 3 Land Force Group
- Queen Alexandra's Mounted Rifles, Royal New Zealand Armoured Corps - Reconnaissance Role (30 NZLAV)
- 2nd/1st Battalion, Royal New Zealand Infantry Regiment (Light Infantry)
- 2nd Canterbury, and Nelson-Marlborough and West Coast Battalion Group (Territorial Force)
- 4th Otago and Southland Battalion Group (Territorial Force)
- 3 Field Troop, 2 Engineer Regiment, Corps of Royal New Zealand Engineers
- 3 Signals Squadron Royal New Zealand Corps of Signals
- 3 Logistics Battalion, Royal New Zealand Army Logistic Regiment
- 3 Military Police Platoon, Royal New Zealand Military Police
- Medical Treatment Centre, 2 Health Services Battalion, Royal New Zealand Army Medical Corps
- Army Adventure Training Centre
- 3 Regional Training Unit
- Health Services School, 2 Health Services Battalion, Royal New Zealand Army Medical Corps
- New Zealand Army Band

=== Former South Island bases and units of the New Zealand Army ===
Historically the South Island has provided 1/3 of the New Zealand Army's strength.

- HQ Southern Military District, King Edward Barracks, Christchurch
- 5th Division (New Zealand) (1942–1943)
- HQ 3 Infantry Brigade, King Edward Barracks, Christchurch
- Addington Barracks, Christchurch
- Canterbury and Nelson Military District Ordnance Depot, King Edwards Barracks, Christchurch, 1907 to 1921
- Canterbury Infantry Regiment, New Zealand Expeditionary Force, (1914–1919)
- Canterbury Mounted Rifle Regiment (1911–1921)
- Canterbury and Nelson Military District Stores Depot, King Edwards Barracks, Christchurch, (1907 to 1921)
- Canterbury Regiment (1921–1964)
- Canterbury Rifle Volunteers (1859–1866)
- Canterbury Yeomanry Cavalry (1921–1944)*
- Otago Districts Stores Depot, Defence Stores Department, St Andrews Street (1907 to 1921)
- Fort Arthur, Nelson
- King Edward Barracks, Christchurch
- Marlborough Rifle Volunteers (1861–1866)
- Nelson Battalion of Militia (1845)
- Nelson, Marlborough and West Coast Regiment (1923–1964)
- Nelson-Marlborough Mounted Rifles(1921–1944)
- Nelson Volunteer Rifles (1860–1901)
- Otago and Southland Regiment (1948–1964)
- Otago Mounted Rifle Regiment (1911–1921)
- Otago Mounted Rifles (1921–1944)
- Otago Regiment (1921–1948)
- Otago Infantry Regiment, New Zealand Expeditionary Force, (1914–1919)
- Southern Districts Ordnance Depot (1921 to 1968)
- Southland Regiment (1921–1948)
- 1st (Canterbury) Regiment (1911–1921)
- 1st Mounted Rifles (Canterbury Yeomanry Cavalry) (1911–1944)
- 2nd Battalion (Canterbury, Nelson, Marlborough and West Coast), Royal New Zealand Infantry Regiment (1964–1999)
- 2nd (South Canterbury) Regiment (1911–1921)
- 3rd Armoured Regiment, Royal New Zealand Armoured Corps (1944–1956)
- 3 Central Ordnance Deport(1968 to 1979)
- 3 Field Ambulance, Royal New Zealand Army Medical Corps
- 3rd Field Regiment Royal New Zealand Artillery (1940–1990)
- 3 Field Squadron, Corps of Royal New Zealand Engineers
- 3 Supply Company (1979 to 1993)
- 3 Transport Squadron, Royal New Zealand Corps of Transport
- 4th Battalion (Otago and Southland), Royal New Zealand Infantry Regiment (1964–1999)
- 4th (Otago Rifles) Regiment (1911–1921)
- 5th Mounted Rifles (Otago Hussars) (1911–1921)
- 5th Light Regiment Royal Regiment of New Zealand Artillery (1956–1964)
- 7th (Southland) Mounted Rifles (1911–1921)
- 8th (South Canterbury) Mounted Rifles (1911–1921)
- 8th (Southland Rifles) Regiment (1911–1921)
- 10th (Nelson) Mounted Rifles (1911–1921)
- 10th (North Otago Rifles) Regiment (1911–1921)
- 11th Coast Regiment Royal Regiment of New Zealand Artillery
- 12th (Nelson and Marlborough) Regiment (1911–1921)
- 12th (Otago) Mounted Rifles (1911–1921)
- 13th Coast Regiment Royal Regiment of New Zealand Artillery
- 13th (North Canterbury and Westland) Regiment (1911–1921)
- 14th (South Otago Rifles) Regiment (1911–1921)
- 20th Armoured Regiment, 2nd New Zealand Expeditionary Force, (1939–1945)
- 20th Battalion, 2nd New Zealand Expeditionary Force, (1939–1945)
- 23rd Battalion, 2nd New Zealand Expeditionary Force, (1939–1945)
- 26th Battalion, 2nd New Zealand Expeditionary Force, (1939–1945)
- 30th Battalion, 2nd New Zealand Expeditionary Force, (1939–1945)
- 37th Battalion, 2nd New Zealand Expeditionary Force, (1939–1945)

== See also ==
- Coastal fortifications of New Zealand
