= List of New Zealand military bases =

This is a list of current New Zealand Defence Force bases. For further detail and/or history please consult the more specific articles for NZ's three military arms – the Royal New Zealand Navy, New Zealand Army and Royal New Zealand Air Force.

== Royal New Zealand Navy ==
see also Naval bases of the Royal New Zealand Navy

=== RNZN bases ===
- Devonport Naval Base, Auckland. Incorporates the Naval Support Command and HMNZS Philomel, which in turn incorporates the Naval College Tamaki (formerly HMNZS Tamaki).

=== Other RNZN facilities ===
- Naval Communications Station Irirangi, near Waiouru, Central North Island
- Tamaki Leadership Centre, Whangaparaoa, Hibiscus Coast, Auckland
- Kauri Point Armament Depot, Birkenhead, Auckland
- Fort Takapuna, Narrowneck Beach, Auckland
- Naval Reserve units:
  - HMNZS Ngapona, Auckland
    - Satellite unit, PHQ Tauranga, Tauranga
  - HMNZS Olphert, Wellington
  - HMNZS Pegasus, Christchurch
  - HMNZS Toroa, Dunedin

=== Former RNZN facilities ===
- RNZN Stores Depot, Islington Bay, Rangitoto
- HMNZS Tamaki, Motuihe Island

== New Zealand Army ==
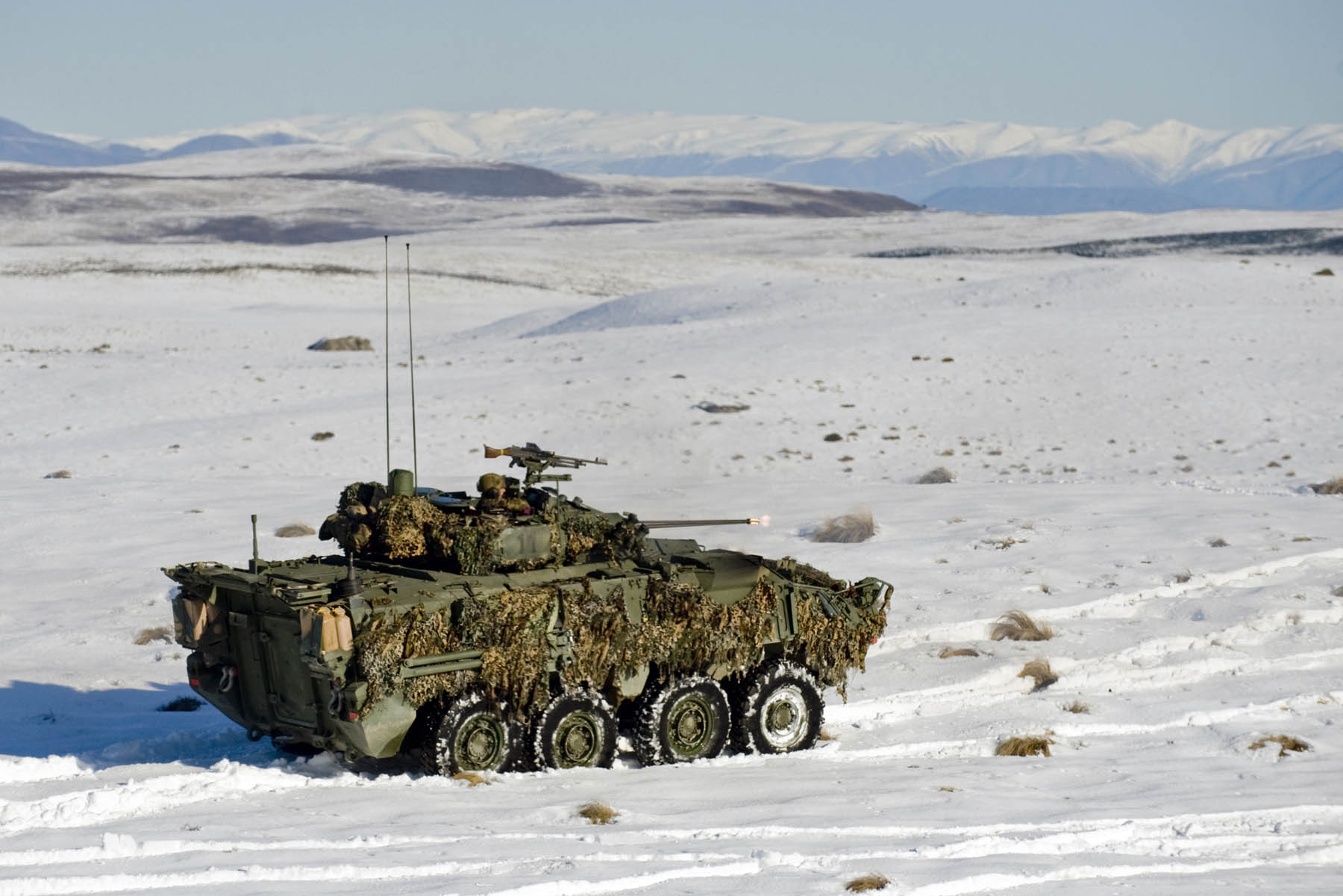
NZLAV at Tekapo Military Training Area

=== Camps and Bases ===
- Papakura Military Camp, Auckland
- Waiouru Military Camp, Waiouru
- Linton Military Camp, Palmerston North
- Trentham Military Camp, Wellington
- Burnham Military Camp, Christchurch
- Balmoral Military Camp, Tekapo

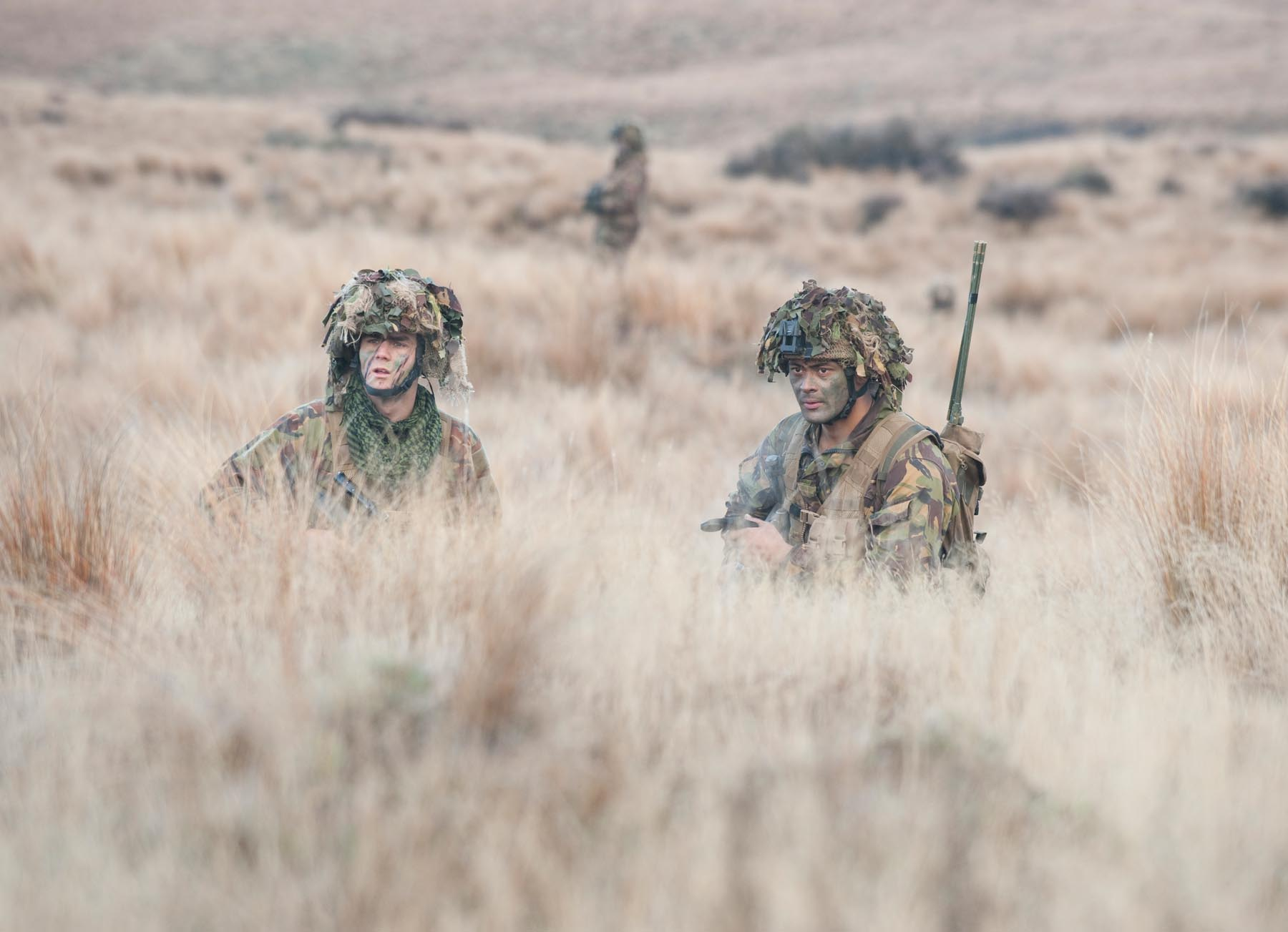
Cadets from the Officer Cadet School conduct live fire training in Waiouru.

=== Training Areas ===
- New Zealand Special Air Service Battle Training Facility, Papakura
- Waiouru Military Training Area, Waiouru
- West Melton Rifle Range, Christchurch
- Tekapo Military Training Area, Tekapo

=== Storage Facilities ===
- Glentunnel Ammunition Depot

=== Reserve Units ===
- Hauraki Army Hall, Tauranga
- Gisborne Army Hall, Gisborne
- Whanganui Army Reserve Base, Whanganui
- Wellington Army Reserve Base, Petone
- Nelson Army Hall, Nelson
- Greymouth Army Hall, Greymouth
- Cromwell Racecourse, Cromwell
- Kensington Barracks, Dunedin
- Invercargill Army Centre, Invercargill

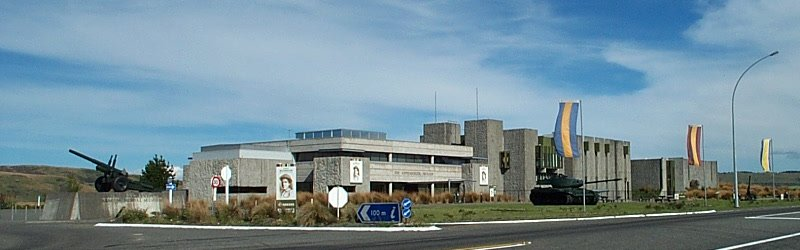
Queen Elizabeth II Army Memorial Museum, Waiouru

=== Other NZ Army facilities ===
- QEII Army Memorial Museum, Waiouru
- Point Jerningham Saluting Battery, Wellington

=== Former NZ Army camps and facilities ===
==== Barracks and Camps ====
- Addington Barracks, Christchurch
- Alexandra Barracks, Wellington
- Dieppe Barracks, Singapore
- King Edward Barracks, Christchurch
- Featherston Military Camp, Featherston
- Hopuhopu Military Camp
- Mangaroa Military Camp, Upper Hutt
- Matakana Military Camp, Matakana
- Terendak Military Camp, Malaysia
- Whangaparaoa Army Base

==== Drill Halls ====
- Hamilton Drill Hall, Knox Street, Hamilton
- Masterton Drill Hall, Masterton

==== Forts ====
- Fort Arthur, Nelson
- Fort Ballance, Wellington
- Fort Cautley, Auckland
- Fort Dorset, Wellington
- Fort Buckley, Wellington
- Fort Kelburne, Wellington
- Fort Richmond NZ, Hutt Valley

==== Storage and Logistics ====
- Alexandra Magazines, Otago
- Belmont Magazines, Wellington
- Defence Stores Department, St Andrews Street, Dunedin (1907 to 1921)
- Kelms Road Magazines, Ngāruawāhia
- Kaikorai Valley Magazines
- Mount Somers Magazines, Canterbury

==== Other Facilities ====
- Land Force Command, Takapuna, Auckland
- Mount Eden, Auckland
- Mount Wellington, Auckland
- Pattie Street, Petone
- Mogadishu Airport, Somalia
- Support Command, Palmerston North
- Sylvia Park, Panmure, Auckland

== Royal New Zealand Air Force ==
=== RNZAF bases ===
- RNZAF Base Auckland, Whenuapai, Auckland
- RNZAF Base Ohakea, Bulls, Manawatū-Whanganui
- RNZAF Base Woodbourne, Blenheim, Marlborough

=== Other RNZAF facilities ===
- RNZAF Dip Flat, Nelson Lakes District
- Air Movements Rongotai, Wellington International Airport, Wellington
- Air Movements Harewood, Christchurch International Airport
- RNZAF Museum, Wigram, Christchurch

=== Former RNZAF bases and facilities ===
- RNZAF Base Hobsonville, Auckland
- RNZAF Base Wigram, Christchurch
- RNZAF Station Te Pirita
- RNZAF Station Waipapakauri
- RNZAF Station Wereroa
- RNZAF Station Onerahi
- RNZAF Base Shelly Bay
- RNZAF Base Linton
- No 1 Stores Depot
  - Te Rapa, Hamilton
  - Otahuhu, Auckland
- No 2 Stores Depot
  - Mangaroa, Wellington
  - Gracefield, Wellington
  - Rongatai, Wellington
- No 3 Stores Depot Weedons, Christchurch
- No 4 Stores Depot Te Awamutu

== Tri-service facilities ==
- Headquarters New Zealand Defence Force, Central Wellington
- Headquarters Joint Forces New Zealand, Trentham, Upper Hutt, Wellington
- Trentham Military Camp, Upper Hutt, Wellington
- Various NZDF Administrative and Recruiting centres throughout New Zealand
- Hokowhitu Campus, Palmerston North, Manawatu

== See also ==
- List of former Royal New Zealand Air Force stations

== links ==
- www.nzdf.mil.nz
- www.army.mil.nz
