= VMF-218 =

Marine Fighting Squadron 218
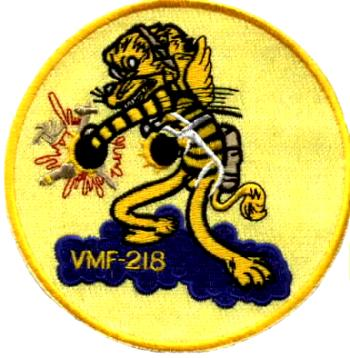
- VMF-218 Insignia
- Active: 1 July 1943 – 31 December 1949; 2 May 1951 - 30 September 1962
- Country: United States
- Allegiance: United States of America
- Branch: United States Marine Corps
- Type: Fighter squadron
- Role: Air interdiction Close air support
- Part of: Inactive
- Nicknames: "Hellions"(WWII) "Firebirds"(Post-war)
- Engagements: World War II * Philippines Campaign (1944–45)

Aircraft flown
- Fighter: F4U-4 Corsair; FJ-4B Fury; F9F Cougar

Marine Fighting Squadron 218 (VMF-218) was a reserve fighter squadron of the United States Marine Corps that was originally activated during World War II. Known as the "Hellions", they flew throughout the South Pacific but saw the majority of their fighting during the Philippines Campaign (1944–45). The squadron was credited with downing 18 enemy aircraft during the course of the war.

== History ==
=== World War II ===
VMF-218 was organized at Marine Corps Air Station Mojave, California on 1 July 1943 and officially commissioned 15 September 1943. They departed the United States in December 1943 on board the USS Barnes (CVE-20) and arrived at Espiritu Santo on 5 January 1944. Their first combat action took place on 15 February when they covered the allied landing on Green Island. On 27 April the squadron moved to Green Island where they remained until November. During their time on Green Island the squadron was one of a number of Marine squadrons that let a then civilian contractor Charles Lindbergh fly strikes against the Japanese garrison at Rabaul.

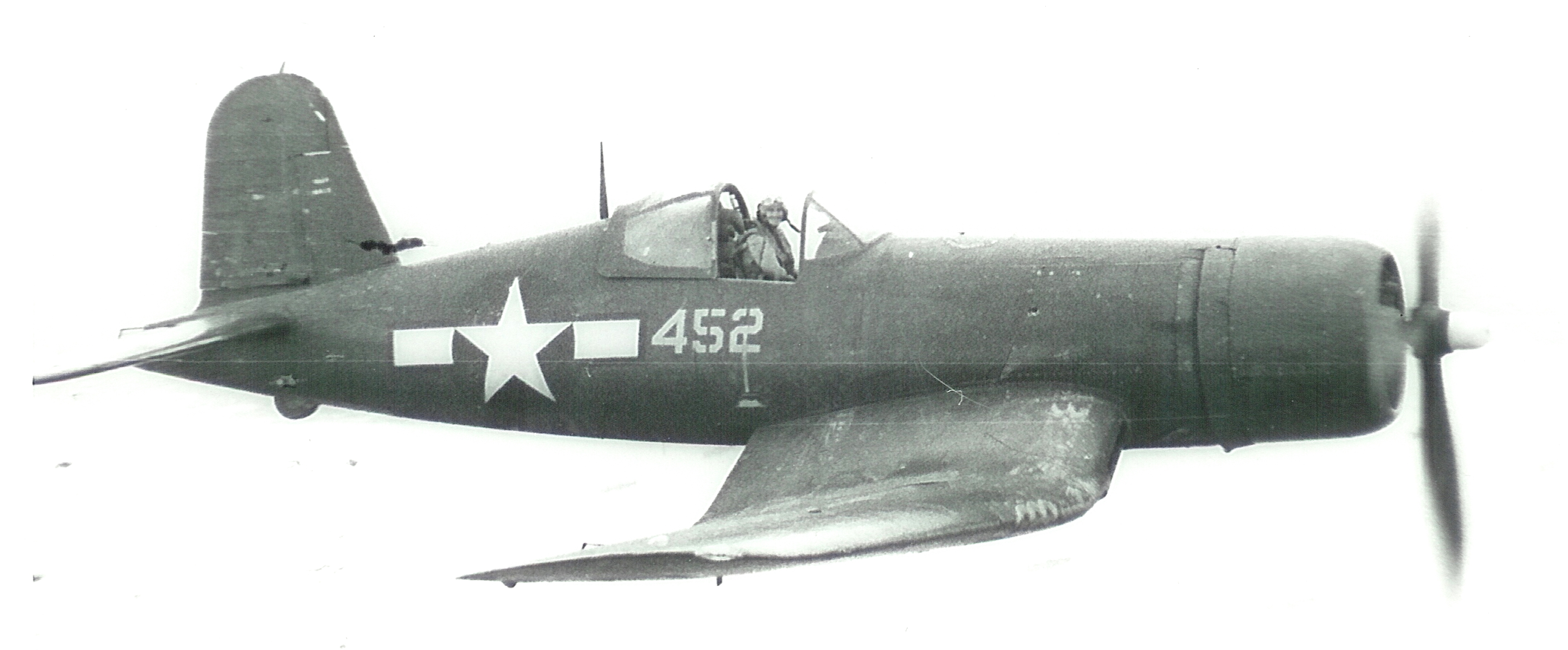
VMF 218 Chance Vought F4U Corsair. Collection of Capt Frank Harriman USMCR

In November they moved to Leyte to take part in the campaign to retake the Philippines. December 1944 would see the squadron as part of Task Force 38 in the Philippine Sea conducting strikes against Southern Luzon. During December they also patrolled the air over shipping in Leyte Gulf and Ormoc Bay flew cover over American convoys in various Philippine waters, escorted South Pacific Combat Air Transport (SCAT) planes over Ormoc where they had dropped supplies to ground troops, flew cover for Army ground forces on Mindoro and Cebu Islands; had covered the landing by Army troops at Zamboanga, chalked up a number of close support missions on Mindanao, escorted rescue planes and transport planes to Mindanao, provided air cover for SBD Dauntless strikes and regularly took part in combat air patrols. From Tacloban the squadron took part in escorting naval convoys, close air support (CAS) and attacks on Iliolo. On 10 March 1945, VMF-218 covered the allied landings at Zamboanga where they would then be based. From the airstrip at Zamboanga the squadron flew CAS at Capisan and conducted strikes against Bongao and Jolo. April would see more strikes against Cotabato, Parang and Malabang and there would be continued strikes against Mindanao until the surrender of Japan.

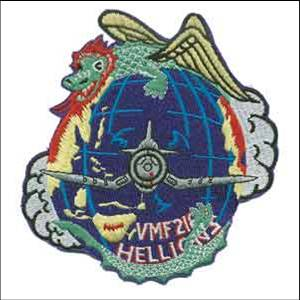
Alternate squadron logo.

Following the war VMF-218 spent a year in China flying in support of the 1st Marine Division during their occupation to surrender of Japanese forces and provide security for the coastal cities against Communist Forces. On 27 April 1946 the squadrons pilots and 20 Vought F4U Corsairs left Guam aboard the escort carrier USS Bairoko. The pilots were embarked to fly the planes to Qingdao, China for delivery to VMF-211. They made it to the southeast of Shanghai on 8 May and flew off the embarked aircraft the next day. During their time in China the squadron flew out of Nanyuan Field near Beiping. Following their year in China the squadron returned to Guam where they would de deactivated as part of the post-war drawdown of forces on 31 December 1949.

=== Reserve years ===
The squadron was reactivated in the Marine Corps Reserve on 2 May 1951 at Naval Air Station Willow Grove near Philadelphia, Pennsylvania. The squadron was decommissioned on 30 September 1962.

== Notable former members ==
- John Glenn

== Gallery ==
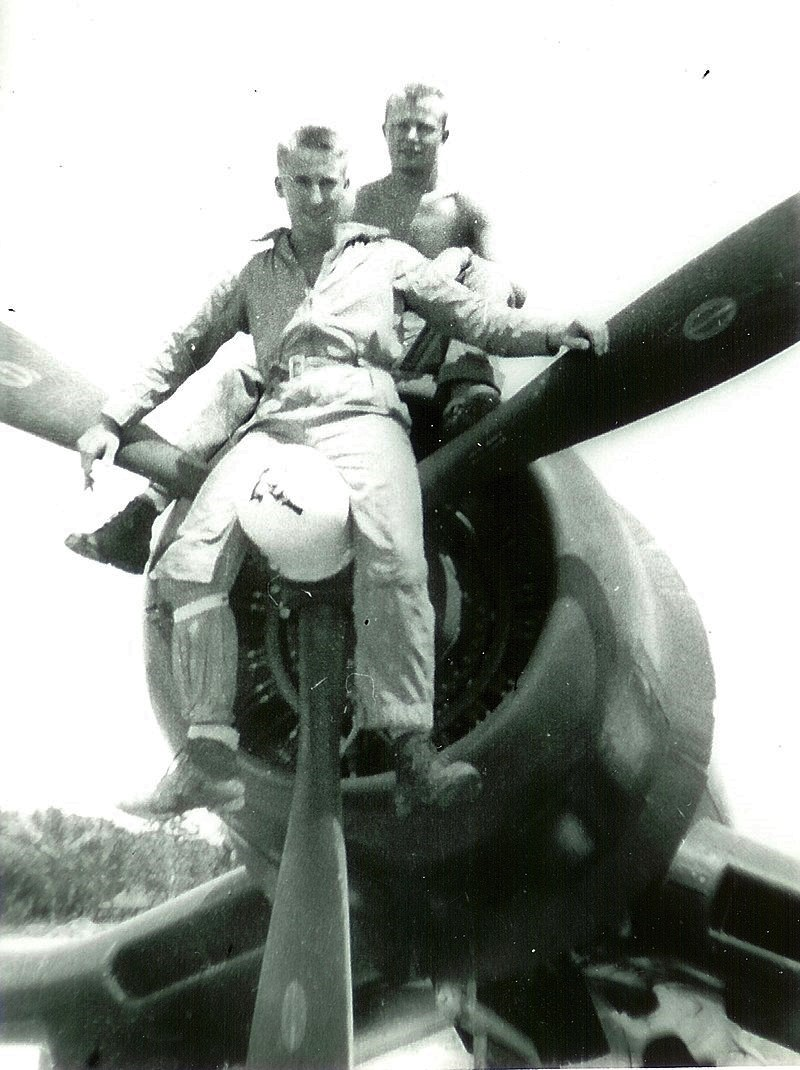
Capt's Herb Person and Don Bean Collection of Capt Frank Harriman USMCR

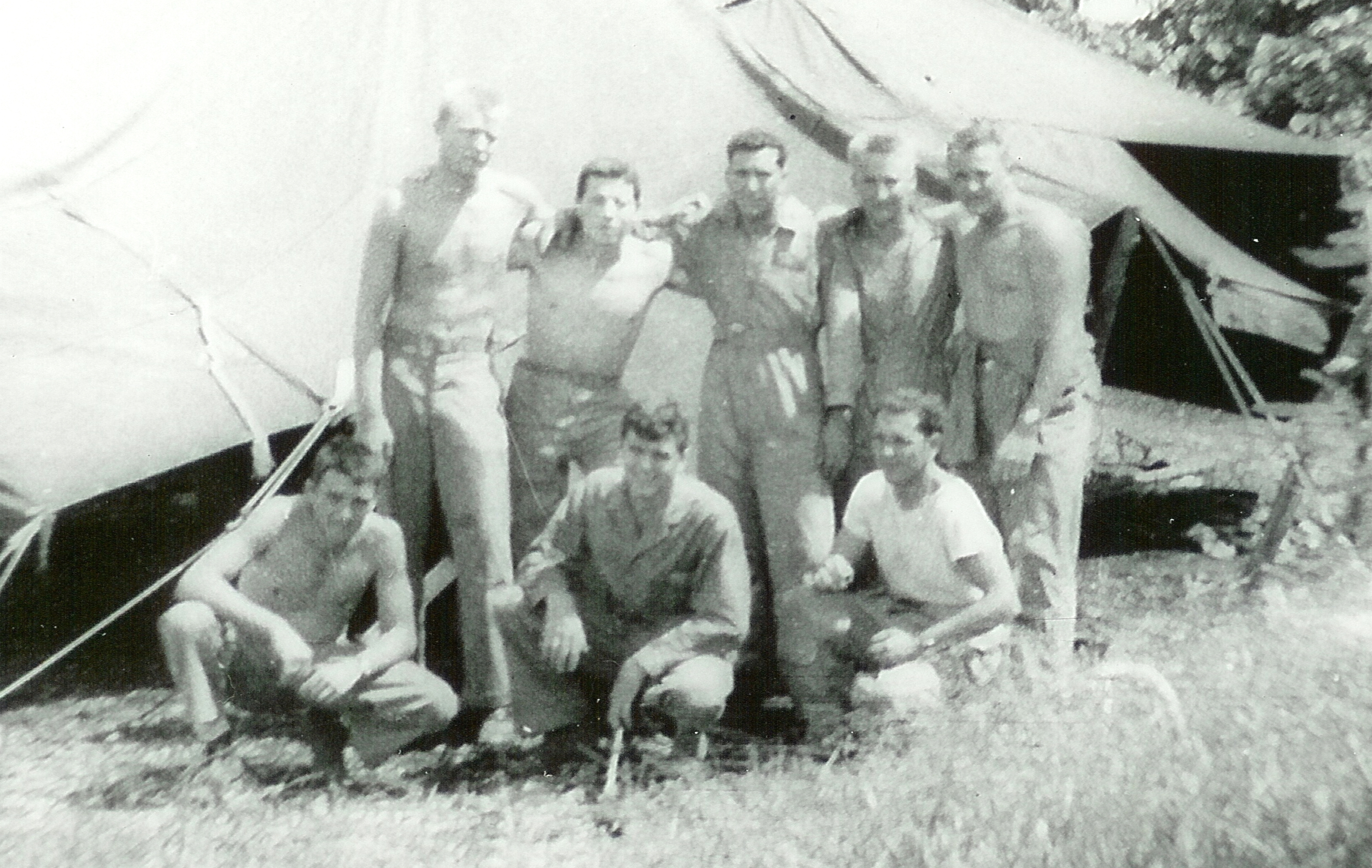
Squadron members Collection of Capt Frank Harriman USMCR

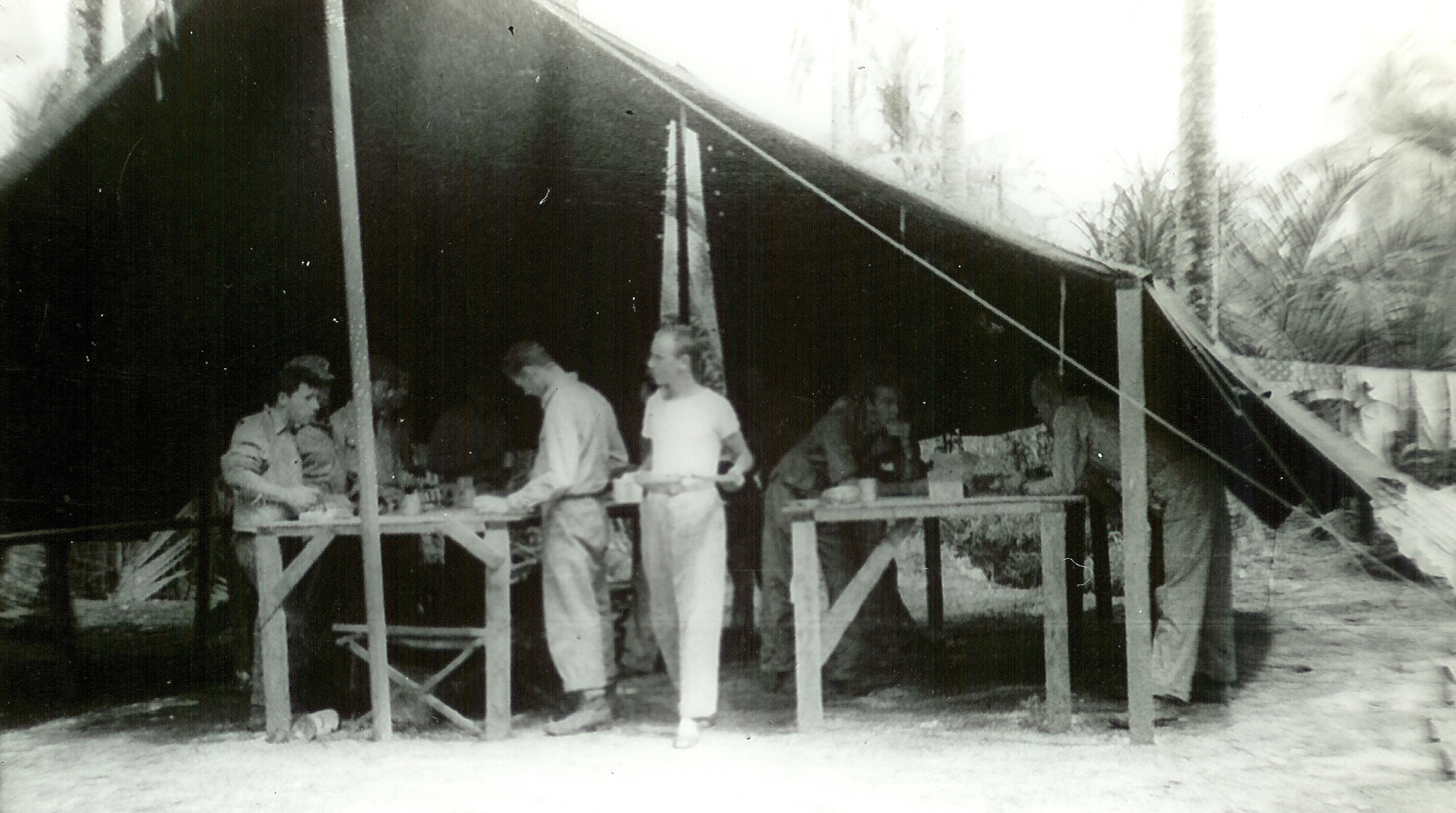
Officer's Mess - Tacloban Island Collection of Capt Frank Harriman USMCR

== Unit awards ==
A unit citation or commendation is an award bestowed upon an organization for the action cited. Members of the unit who participated in said actions are allowed to wear on their uniforms the awarded unit citation. VMF-218 was presented with the following awards:

Ribbon	Unit Award
	Navy Unit Commendation
	Asiatic-Pacific Campaign Medal
	World War II Victory Medal
	Navy Occupation Service Medal
	China Service Medal
	National Defense Service Medal

== See also ==
- United States Marine Corps Aviation
- List of active United States Marine Corps aircraft squadrons
- List of decommissioned United States Marine Corps aircraft squadrons
