= No. 20 Squadron RNZAF =

No. 20 Squadron
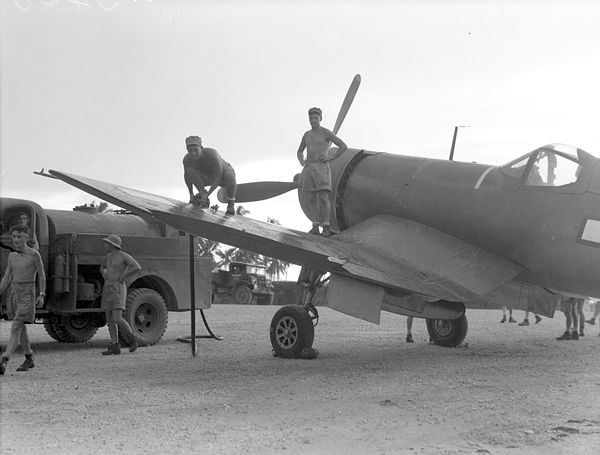
- Ground crew refueling a No. 20 Squadron Corsair, Guadalcanal
- Active: 1942–1943; 1944–1945
- Country: New Zealand
- Branch: Royal New Zealand Air Force
- Type: Fighter bomber
- Garrison/HQ: RNZAF Base Ohakea
- Engagements: World War II: Pacific theatre

No. 20 Squadron was a squadron of the Royal New Zealand Air Force. It was first established at as an army co-operation unit, serving in this role between 1942 and 1943. In January 1944, the squadron was reformed as a fighter unit at equipped with P-40 Kittyhawks. It later flew F4U-1 Corsair fighter bombers.

== History ==
No. 20 Squadron originally raised as an army co-operation squadron in 1942, based at Onerahi from August 1942 until July 1943. After being re-raised as a fighter unit in January 1944, the squadron was deployed to Kukum Field on Guadalcanal from April to May 1944 and then to Piva Airfield on Bougainville from May to June 1944. The squadron deployed to Palikulo Bay Airfield on Espiritu Santo from August to September 1944 and then returned to Guadalcanal from September to October 1944. The squadron deployed to Green Island on 26 October 1944 assuming responsibility for local patrols and Dumbo escort. The squadron returned to Santo in January 1945, then deployed to Bougainville until April 1945 and Jacquinot Bay from May to August 1945.

== Commanding officers ==
- Squadron Leader S. R. Duncan: January–July 1944;
- Squadron Leader G. M. Robertson: July–November 1944;
- Squadron Leader L. R. Reynolds: December 1944–September 1945.
