= No. 2 Squadron RNZAF =

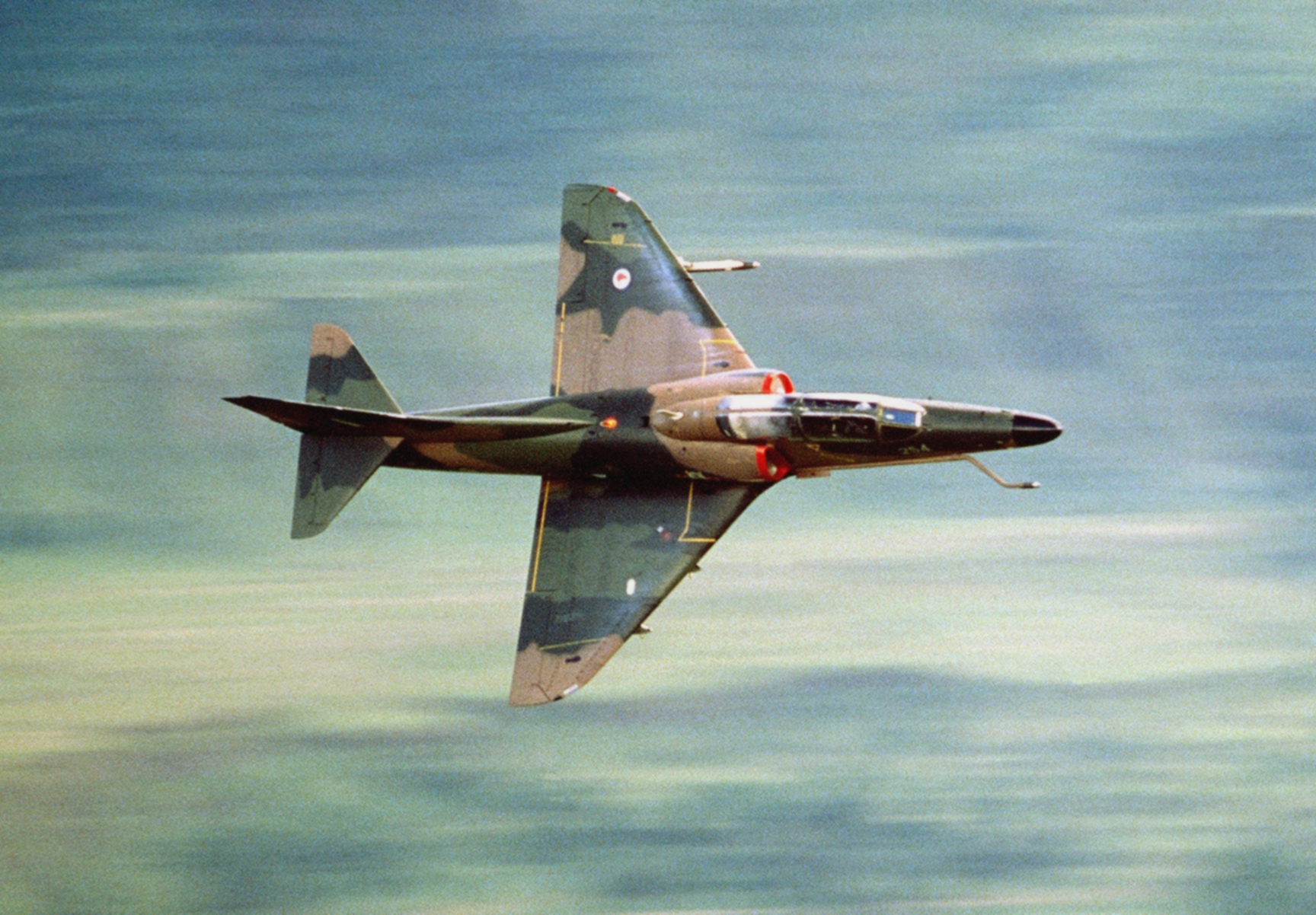
- RNZAF TA-4K in 1984
- Active: 1930–1957; December 1984 – December 2001
- Country: New Zealand
- Branch: Royal New Zealand Air Force
- Role: Reconnaissance, Fighter-Attack, Skyhawk Conversion.
- Size: One Squadron
- Garrison/HQ: RNZAF Base Ohakea, HMAS Albatross
- Mottos: Maori Whakatopa Kia Mate; English We Swoop to Kill
- Colors: Yellow and black
- Mascot: A winged Taiaha
- Equipment: Lockheed Hudson (1941–1943); Lockheed Ventura (1943–1945); A-4 Skyhawk (1984–2001)
- Engagements: World War II

Insignia
- Squadron Badge: A winged Taiaha

No. 2 Squadron RNZAF was a squadron of the Royal New Zealand Air Force (RNZAF). It was formed in 1930 as part of the Territorial Air Force with the main headquarters at Wellington and shadow flights at New Plymouth and Wanganui. Squadron personnel conducted their annual flying at RNZAF Base Wigram. In 1937 the Territorial Squadrons were re-organised and No. 2 Squadron became the Wellington Territorial Squadron.

== History ==
=== World War II ===
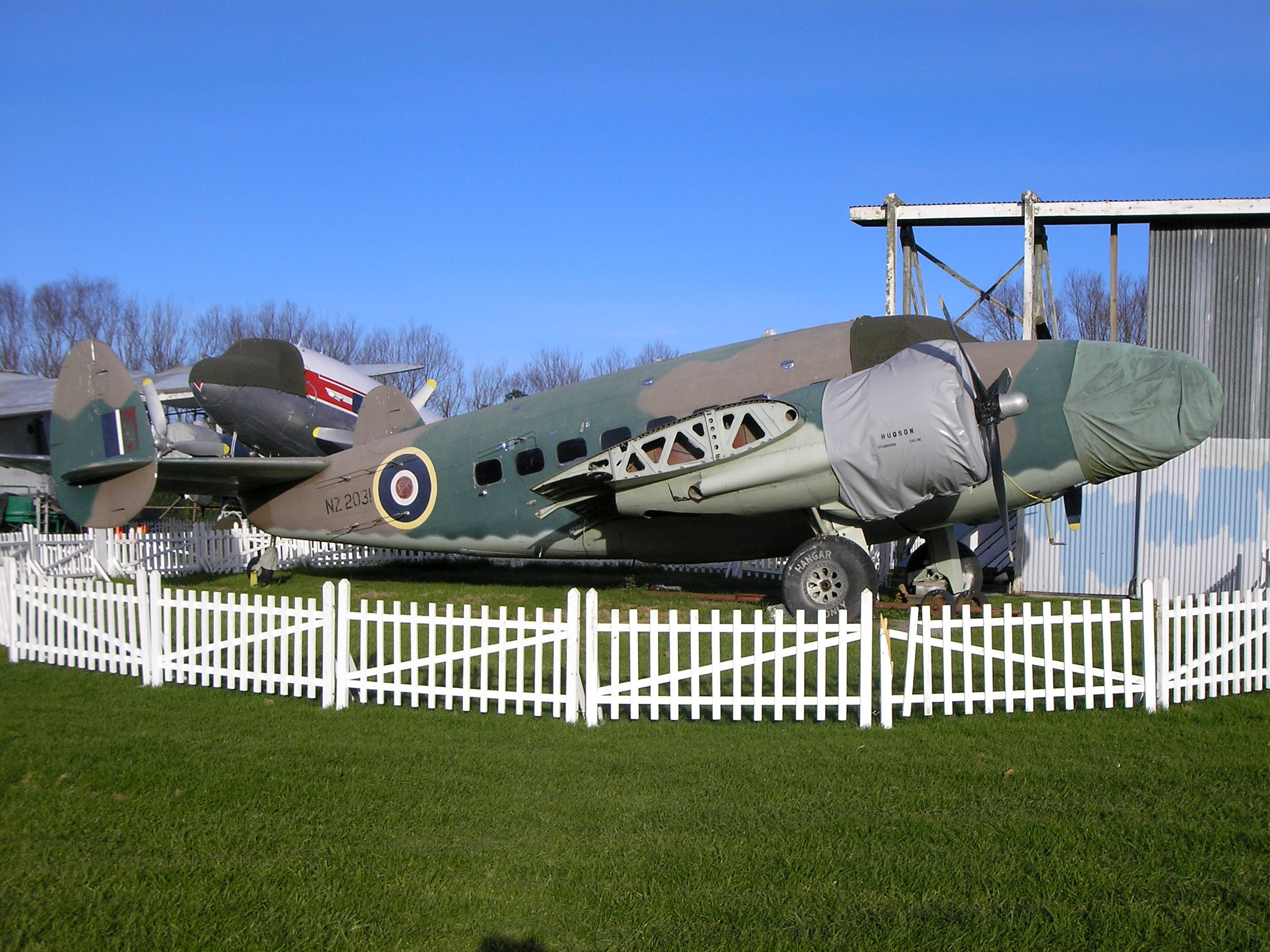
This Hudson served with 2 Squadron from 1941 to 1943

The squadron received its first aircraft, 12 Blackburn Baffins, in 1938 and at the outbreak of World War II the squadron moved to Blenheim to undertake its general reconnaissance role of protecting Cook Strait. A year later, in 1940, all Territorial Squadrons were merged to become the New Zealand General Reconnaissance Squadron, based at Whenuapai, Auckland. Within 12 months, No. 2 Squadron was reformed. Based at Nelson with Vickers Vildebeests and Vickers Vincent aircraft, it resumed its protection of Cook Strait providing air cover for troop ship convoys entering and leaving Wellington. Later in 1941, the squadron was re-equipped with the new Lockheed Hudson Bomber and in 1943 re-equipped once more, this time with Lockheed Ventura aircraft.

In November 1943, the squadron moved to Palikulo Bay Airfield on Espiritu Santo, where it carried out reconnaissance, anti-submarine, supply dropping and general flight patrols. No. 2 Squadron returned to New Zealand in 1944, but this was short-lived as it returned to operational status in the Pacific, replacing No.1 Squadron on dawn and dusk patrols and anti-submarine patrols. It was during this tour that the squadron made the heaviest raid by a New Zealand formation in the South Pacific; eight aircraft dropped 40,000 lb of bombs in southwest Bougainville. This second tour finished in March 1945, and three months later the squadron began its third and last operational tour, consisting of mainly bombing land targets. The squadron returned to RNZAF Base Ohakea in October 1945.

During the operational tours of the South West Pacific the squadron was based at Espiritu Santo, Guadalcanal, New Georgia, Bougainville, Green Island and Jacquinot Bay. On return to New Zealand in October 1945, No. 2 Squadron operated a variety of aircraft, including Hudsons (maintaining air/sea rescue detachments at Whenuapai and Norfolk Island) and Venturas (twin-engine pilot conversion and meteorological flights). Early in 1946, No. 2 Squadron also began training crews for the new Mosquito aircraft to be ferried from the United Kingdom to New Zealand.

=== Post-war ===
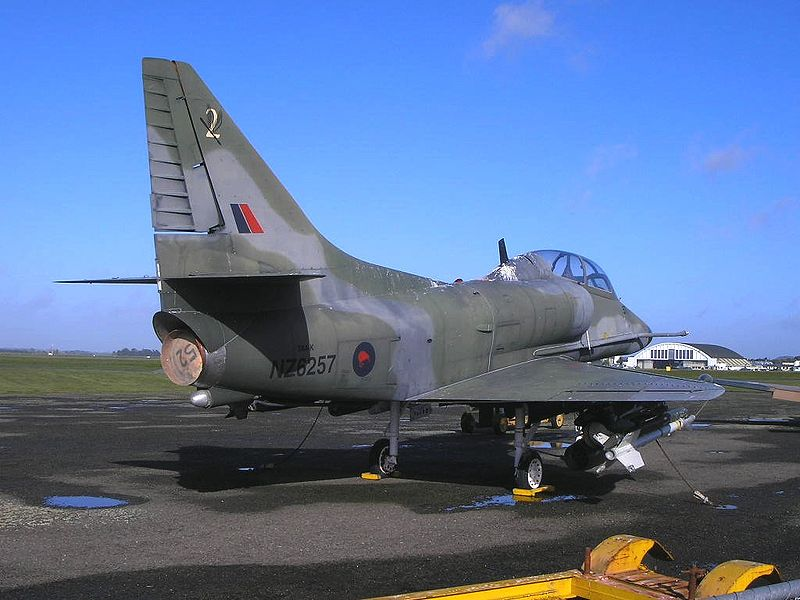
TA-4K in the colours of 2 Squadron RNZAF; photographed 5 years after the type was retired at Ohakea. This Skyhawk is now on display outside the Ohakea Officers mess

On 11 October 1946 No. 2 Squadron ceased to exist when its name changed to No.75 Squadron RNZAF, in commemoration of the New Zealand Bomber Squadron which served throughout the war in the British Royal Air Force.

The Territorial Squadrons were reformed and in December 1948 No. 2 (TAF) Squadron was raised. This squadron operated in a similar manner to its 1930s predecessor with annual flying carried out at Ohakea and Wigram on Harvards and Mustangs. The Territorial Squadrons were eventually disbanded in 1957.

Reformed in December 1984 at Ohakea, No. 2 Squadron was equipped with the McDonnell Douglas A-4G Skyhawk when it took delivery of 10 ex-RAN Skyhawks (8 A-4G and 2 TA-4G) aircraft. While stationed at Ohakea (alongside No. 75 Squadron), the squadron provided pilot conversion and operational training, and was tasked for reconnaissance, systems evaluation, and procedures development.

In the middle of 1988 the Squadron received delivery of the first Project KAHU updated Skyhawks for test flight trials. In February 1991 No. 2 Squadron was relocated to HMAS Albatross in Australia with the updated Kahu Skyhawks to provide the Australian Defence Force (ADF), particularly the Royal Australian Navy (RAN), with Air Defence Support, participating in exercises with RAN warships. The squadron was equipped with two A-4K and four TA-4K aircraft supported by 50 to 60 personnel. The highlight of the RAN exercises was the successful sinking of the decommissioned HMAS Adroit in August 1994 by No. 2 Squadron Skyhawks. No. 2 Squadron continued to provide air defence training to the ADF until November 2001.

In a highly controversial move, the RNZAF Air Combat Force comprising Number 2, 14, and 75 Squadrons was disbanded on 13 December 2001 by the Labour Government under Helen Clark.
