= No. 16 Squadron RNZAF =

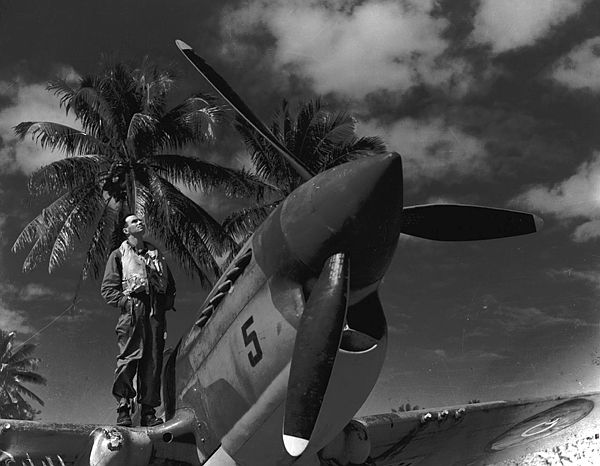
- Flight Lieutenant Day of No. 16 Squadron with his Kittyhawk, 1943
- Active: 1942–1945
- Country: New Zealand
- Branch: Royal New Zealand Air Force
- Role: Fighter

No. 16 Squadron was a fighter squadron of the Royal New Zealand Air Force. Formed in July 1942 at RNZAF Base Woodbourne, the squadron was equipped with Curtiss P-40 Kittyhawks and later F4U Corsairs. The squadron fought in the Southwest Pacific theatre during the Second World War, flying combat operations against Japanese forces. Following the cessation of hostilities, the squadron returned to New Zealand where it was disbanded in October 1945.

== History ==
It was formed on 1 July 1942 at RNZAF Base Woodbourne, near Blenheim, under the command of Squadron Leader A. Jones. The squadron was initially equipped with P-40 Kittyhawk fighters but in 1944 it converted to the Vought F4U Corsair fighter. It served in Espiritu Santo, Guadalcanal, New Georgia, Bougainville and Green Island.

On 15 January 1945, No. 14 Squadron RNZAF, alongside No. 16 Squadron, mounted an attack on Toboi, southwest of Rabaul. One of its Corsairs was shot down and the pilot parachuted into Simpson Harbour. The fighters of both squadrons provided fighter cover for a possible rescue operation until the evening when, low on fuel they returned to Green Island. Encountering a tropical storm during their return flight, five Corsairs crashed into the sea, one crashed at Green Island while landing and a seventh disappeared in clouds with all seven pilots killed. The shot down pilot was captured by the Japanese and died in captivity.

Its final weeks of service were spent at Jacquinot Bay where, following the end of the war it carried out security patrols in the area before returning to New Zealand and being disbanded in October 1945.

== Commanding officers ==
The following served as commanding officers of No. 16 Squadron:

- Squadron Leader A. N. Jones (June 1942–May 1943);
- Squadron Leader J. S. Nelson (May–September 1943);
- Squadron Leader J. H. Arkwright (October 1943–January 1944);
- Squadron Leader A. G. Sievers (January–June 1944);
- Squadron Leader M. C. P. Jones (June–September 1944);
- Squadron Leader P. S. Green (October 1944–June 1945);
- Squadron Leader J. H. Mills (July–October 1945).

== Gallery ==
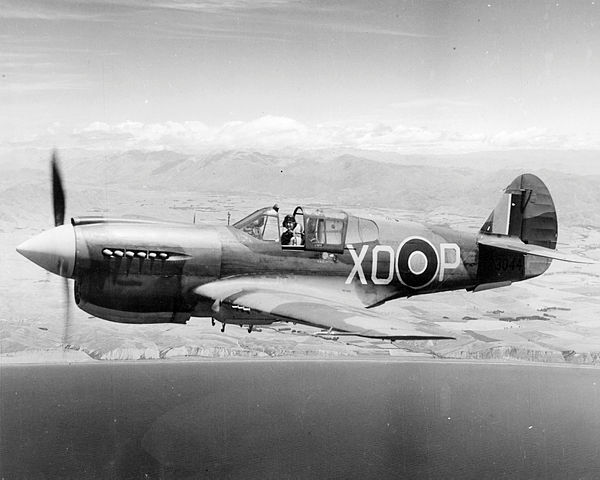
A Kittyhawk of No. 16 Squadron in flight over the New Zealand coastline

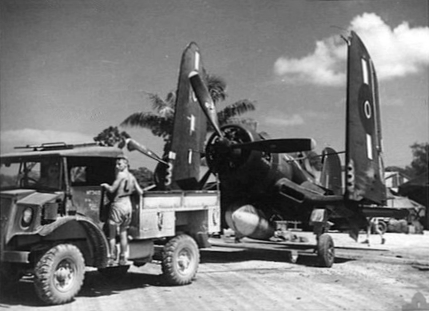
A No. 16 Squadron F4U-1 on Green Island, 1944

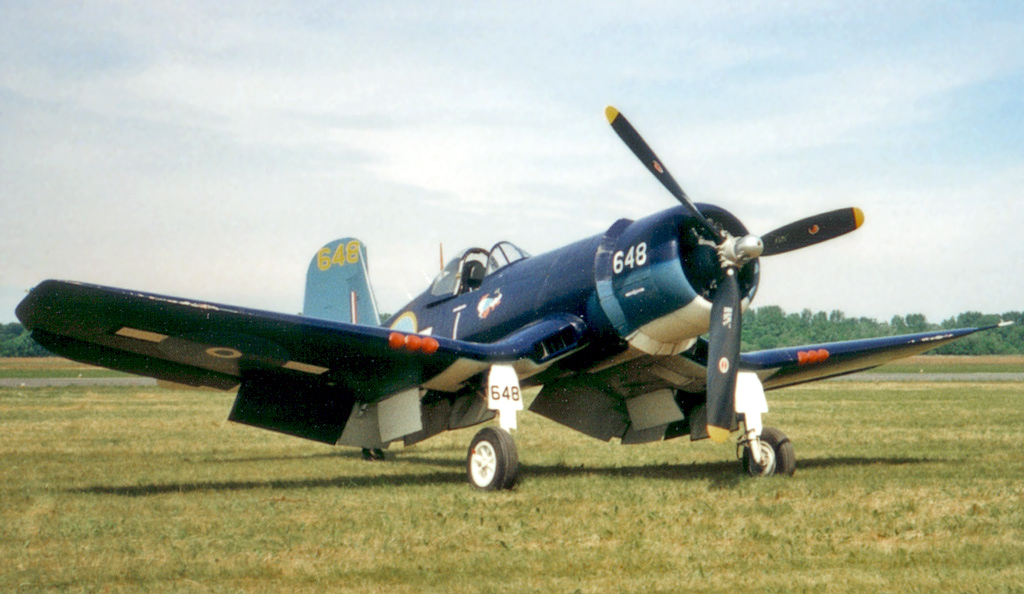
Restored RNZAF Corsair
