= No. 24 Squadron RNZAF =

No. 24 Squadron
- Active: 1944–1945
- Country: New Zealand
- Branch: Royal New Zealand Air Force
- Type: Fighter bomber
- Engagements: World War II: Pacific theatre

No. 24 Squadron Royal New Zealand Air Force was a fighter squadron. Formed in September 1944, it was equipped with Vought F4U-1 Corsair fighter bombers.

== History ==
24 Squadron was deployed to Piva Airfield on Bougainville from December 1944-January 1945 then to Palikulo Bay Airfield on Espiritu Santo. 24 Squadron deployed to Green Island from March–May 1945, to Bougainville from July–October 1945 and then to Santo from October 1945 where it was disbanded.

== Commanding officers ==
- Squadron Leader M. T. Vanderpump (October 1944-January 1945);
- Squadron Leader A. G. S. George (February–October 1945).
