= Jacquinot Bay Airport =

Airport in Jacquinot Bay, East New Britain, Papua New Guinea

- IATA: JAQ; ICAO: AYJB

Summary
- Airport type: Public
- Location: Jacquinot Bay, Papua New Guinea
- Elevation AMSL: 210 ft (64 m)
- Coordinates: 5°39′09″S 151°30′25″E

Map
- Location of airport in Papua-New Guinea

Runways
Direction	Length		Surface
Direction	m	ft	Surface
16/34	1,715	5,627
- Source:, PNG Airstrip Guide

Jacquinot Bay Airport (English: /ʒækɪˈnoʊ/ zhak-ih-NOH, French: [ʒakino]; IATA: JAQ, ICAO: AYJB) is an airport near Jacquinot Bay in the East New Britain Province on the island of New Britain in Papua New Guinea. The airstrip was liberated by the Australian Army in 1944, and an airstrip was built by 1945. There is no scheduled airline service.

== History ==
=== World War II ===
The Jacquinot Bay area was liberated by the Australian Army on 4 November 1944. The 2/3 Railway Construction Company and the 17th Field Company RAE began construction of an airfield and in February 1945, No. 1 Airfield Construction Squadron expanded the base. The airfield had a single coral 100 by 6,100 feet (30 m × 1,859 m) runway.

Royal Australian Air Force units based here included:

- No. 79 Squadron operating Mark VIII Spitfires
- No. 18 (NEI) Squadron operating North American B-25 Mitchell from February–June 1945

Royal New Zealand Air Force units based here included:

- No. 2 Squadron operating Lockheed Venturas from June–September 1945
- No. 16 Squadron operating F4Us from August–October 1945
- No. 19 Squadron operating F4Us from June–October 1945
- No. 20 Squadron operating F4Us from May–August 1945
- No. 21 Squadron operating F4Us from May–July 1945

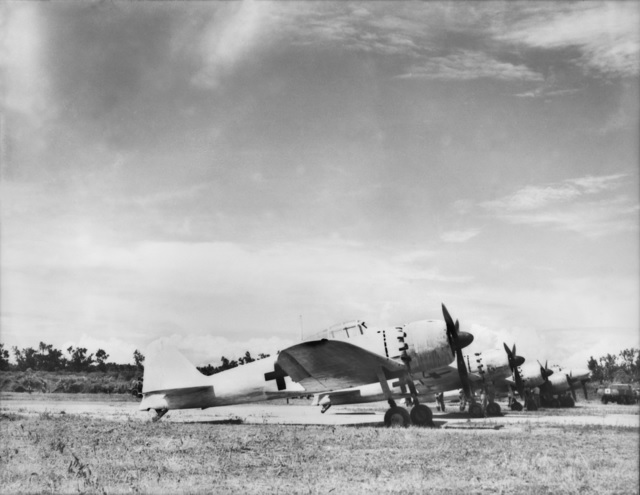
Surrendered A6M5s at Jacquinot Bay, September 1945

Following the Japanese surrender several Japanese aircraft were flown from Vunakanau Airfield to Jacquinot Bay Airfield.

=== Postwar ===
On 15 November 1945 an RAAF C-47 #13339 crashed into a mountain on a flight from Jacquinot Bay to Rabaul, all 28 passengers and crew were killed.

== Facilities ==
The airport has one runway which measures 1,715 metres (5,627 ft) in length.
