= Nissan Island Airport =

Airport in Nissan Island, Bougainville, Papua New Guinea

- IATA: IIS; ICAO: AYIA

Summary
- Location: Nissan Island, Papua New Guinea
- Elevation AMSL: 100 ft (30 m)
- Coordinates: 4°30′00″S 154°13′35.76″E

Map
- Location of airport in Papua New Guinea

Runways
Direction	Length		Surface
Direction	m	ft	Surface
14/32	1,200	3,937
- Source: PNG Airstrip Guide

Nissan Island Airport (IATA: IIS, ICAO: AYIA) is an airfield serving Nissan Island, in the Autonomous Region of Bougainville in Papua New Guinea. It resides at an elevation of 100 feet (30 m) above mean sea level and has a 1,200-metre (3,937 ft) runway designated 14/32.

== History ==
=== World War II ===
Lagoon Airfield Ocean Airfield
- Nissan Island

Site information
- Type: Military Airfield
- Controlled by: Royal New Zealand Air Force; United States Marine Corps
- Condition: abandoned

Location
- Coordinates: 04°30′10.8″S 154°13′30″E

Site history
- Built: 1944
- Built by: Seebees
- In use: 1944-5
- Materials: Coral
- Battles/wars: Bougainville Campaign; Operation Cartwheel

The New Zealand 3rd Division landed on Nissan Island on 15 February 1944 as part of the Solomon Islands campaign. U.S. Navy Seebees from the 33rd, 37th and 93rd Naval Construction Battalions landed with the New Zealanders and began building support facilities. Work on a fighter airstrip began on 20 February and by 5 March a coral-surfaced 5,000 feet (1,500 m) by 150 feet (46 m) fighter runway known as Lagoon Airfield was ready for use and aircraft carried out the first attack on Kavieng. In late March a parallel 6,000 feet (1,800 m) by 150 feet (46 m) bomber runway known as Ocean Airfield was ready for use, it was later lengthened to 7,300 feet (2,200 m). Additional airfield facilities such as road and taxiways and a tank farm were also constructed. Construction had been extremely difficult with dense foliage and large trees needing to be removed, rock blasting was necessary, and all coral used for filling had to be quarried at distant locations. Today's air port exists on the site of the "Ocean airfield".

US Navy units based at Nissan Island included:

- Special Task Air Group One (STAG-1) operating TDR drones
- VMTB-341 operating SBDs from July–December 1944

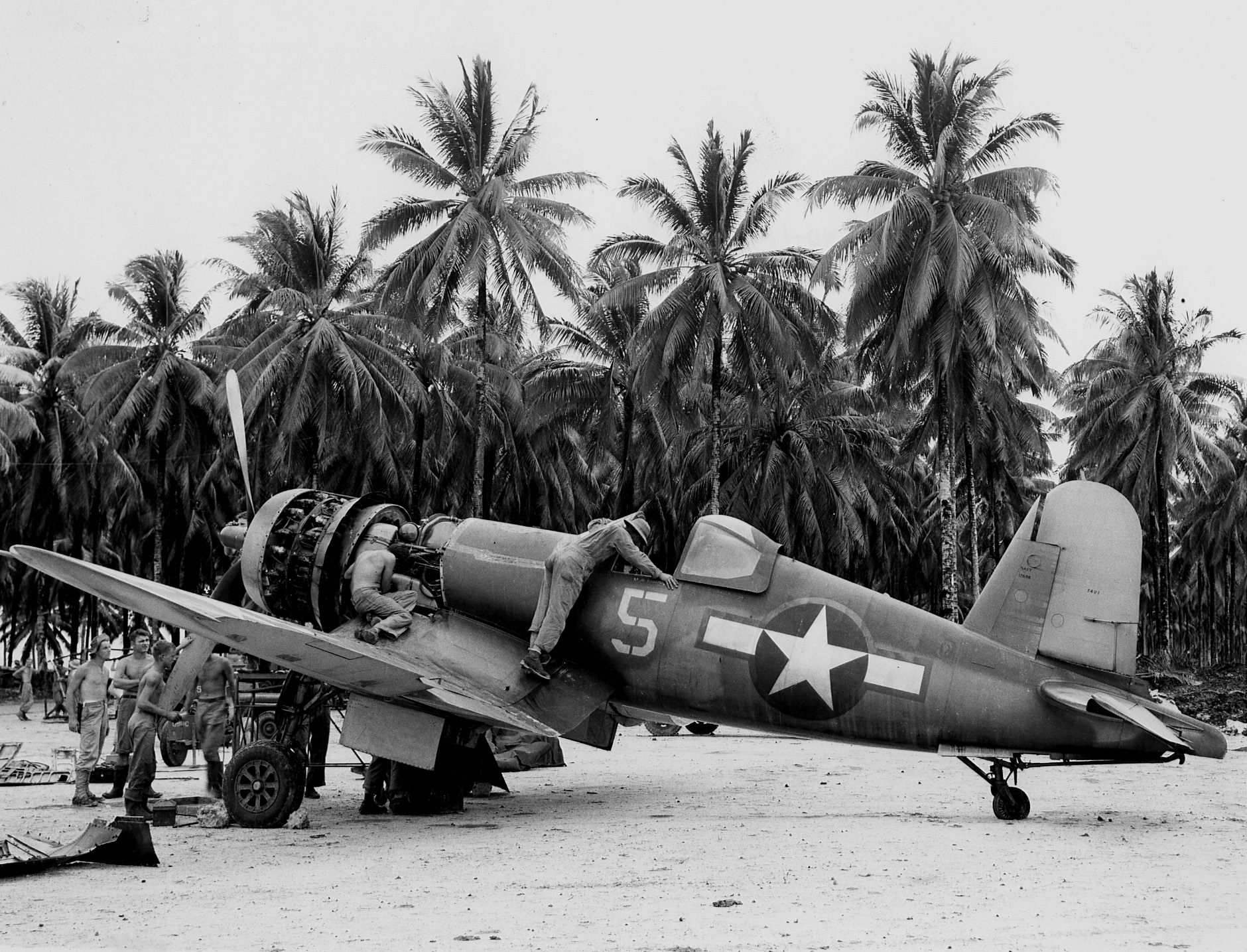
F4U-1A Corsair of VF-17 on Green Island in 1944

USMC units based at Nissan Island included:

- VMB-423 operating PBJs from July–August 1944
- VMB-433 operating PBJs from July–August 1944
- VMF-218 operating F4Us from April–November 1944
- VMF-222 operating F4Us
- VMF-223 operating F4Us

Royal New Zealand Air Force units based at Nissan Island included:

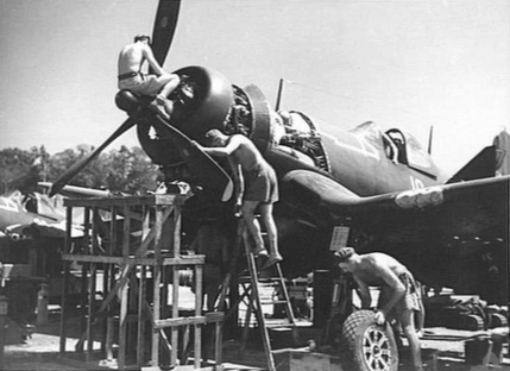
An F4U of 16 Squadron being serviced in December 1944

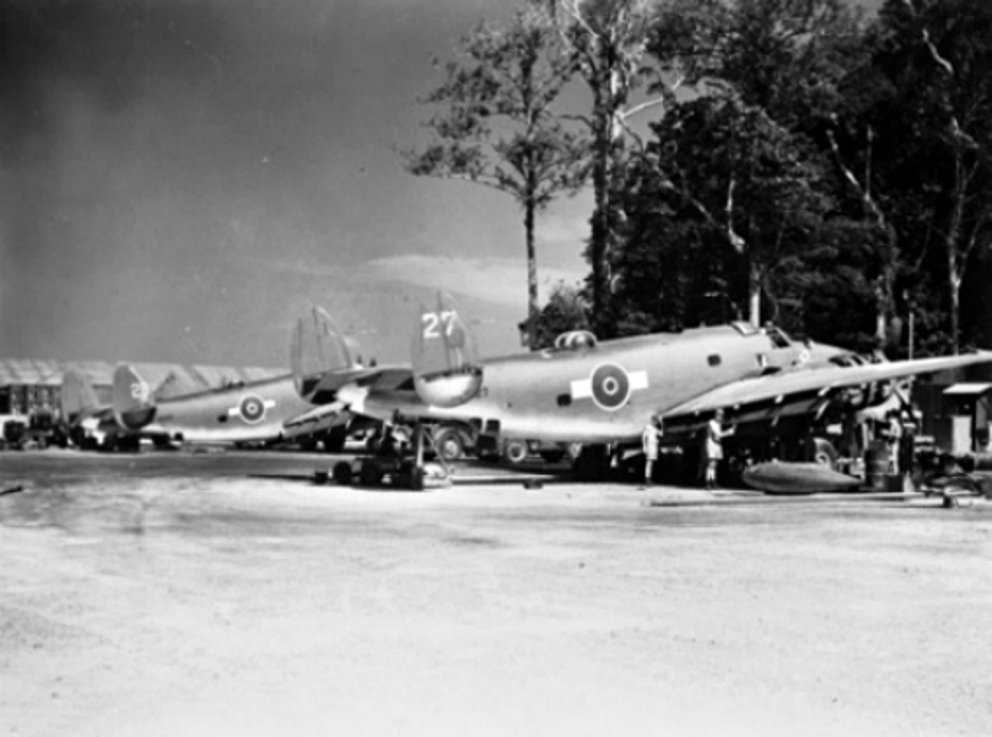
RNZAF Venturas in December 1944

- 1 Squadron operating Lockheed Venturas from October 1944-January 1945
- 2 Squadron operating Venturas from January–March 1945
- 3 Squadron operating Venturas from March–June 1945
- 14 Squadron operating F4Us from December 1944-January 1945
- 15 Squadron operating F4Us from February–April 1945
- 16 Squadron operating F4Us from December 1944-February 1945
- 17 Squadron operating F4Us from January–March 1945
- 18 Squadron operating F4Us from November–December 1944
- 20 Squadron operating F4Us from October–November 1944
- 21 Squadron operating F4Us from April–May 1945
- 24 Squadron operating F4Us from March–May 1945

In late 1944 airfield roll-up activities were commenced and were completed by August 1945.

=== Postwar ===
Lagoon Airfield was abandoned after the war, while Ocean Airfield remained in use as a civilian airfield.

== Airlines and destinations ==
No known scheduled services.
