= No. 21 Squadron RNZAF =

No. 21 Squadron
- Active: 1944–1945
- Country: New Zealand
- Branch: Royal New Zealand Air Force
- Type: Fighter bomber
- Engagements: World War II: Pacific theatre

No. 21 Squadron was a squadron of the Royal New Zealand Air Force. Formed in May 1944, it was equipped with F4U-1 Corsair fighter bombers.

== History ==
No. 21 Squadron, which was equipped with Vought F4U Corsair fighters, was deployed to Kukum Field on Guadalcanal from June–July 1944, to Piva Airfield on Bougainville from July–September 1944 and then returned to Guadalcanal from November–December 1944. The squadron deployed to Green Island from April–May 1945 and then to Jacquinot Bay from May–July 1945. It was disbanded in September 1945.

== Commanding officers ==
- Squadron Leader L. R. Bush (May 1944–February 1945);
- Squadron Leader W. J. MacLeod (March–September 1945).
