= General Service Training School =

Coordinates: 41°30′41″S 173°52′14″E

Command and Recruit Training Squadron (CRTS) of the Royal New Zealand Air Force is the principal training facility for RNZAF recruits. Located at RNZAF Base Woodbourne, it takes recruits through a 13-week training program designed to produce airmen and airwomen for the RNZAF.

== Classifications ==
Recruits who are below the age of 18 are classified as Air Force Cadet - Youth (AF CDT(Y)). Those who are 18 and older are classified as Air Force Cadet - Adult (AF CDT (A)). Upon graduation from CRTS, the (A)'s are reclassified as Aircraftsman (AC)'s. (Y)'s cannot be reclassified as AC until they turn to the age of 18. Regardless of classification, all CRTS recruits wear the blank shoulder board of an Aircraftsman on their epaulettes.

== Instructors ==
Instructors at CRTS are generally RNZAF Force Protection Corporals and Sergeants who are responsible for each training a flight of recruits. Their job classification at CRTS is Recruit Instructors. Sergeant and Flight Sergeant supervise the corporals. Apart from the Commanding Officer and the Adjutant, there are a few officers who help out in class instruction. The CRTS Warrant Officer is the chief disciplinarian.

== Training ==
Recruits are instructed in military history, customs and courtesies, drill, rifle shooting and maintenance, life saving, military administrative procedures, orienteering and map reading, NBC warfare, military rank structures, insignia recognition, interior economy, and 10 days in the field at RNZAF Dip Flat in which the CRTS training is put to the test.
