= RNZAF Base Woodbourne =

RNZAF Base Woodbourne Tempered and Ready

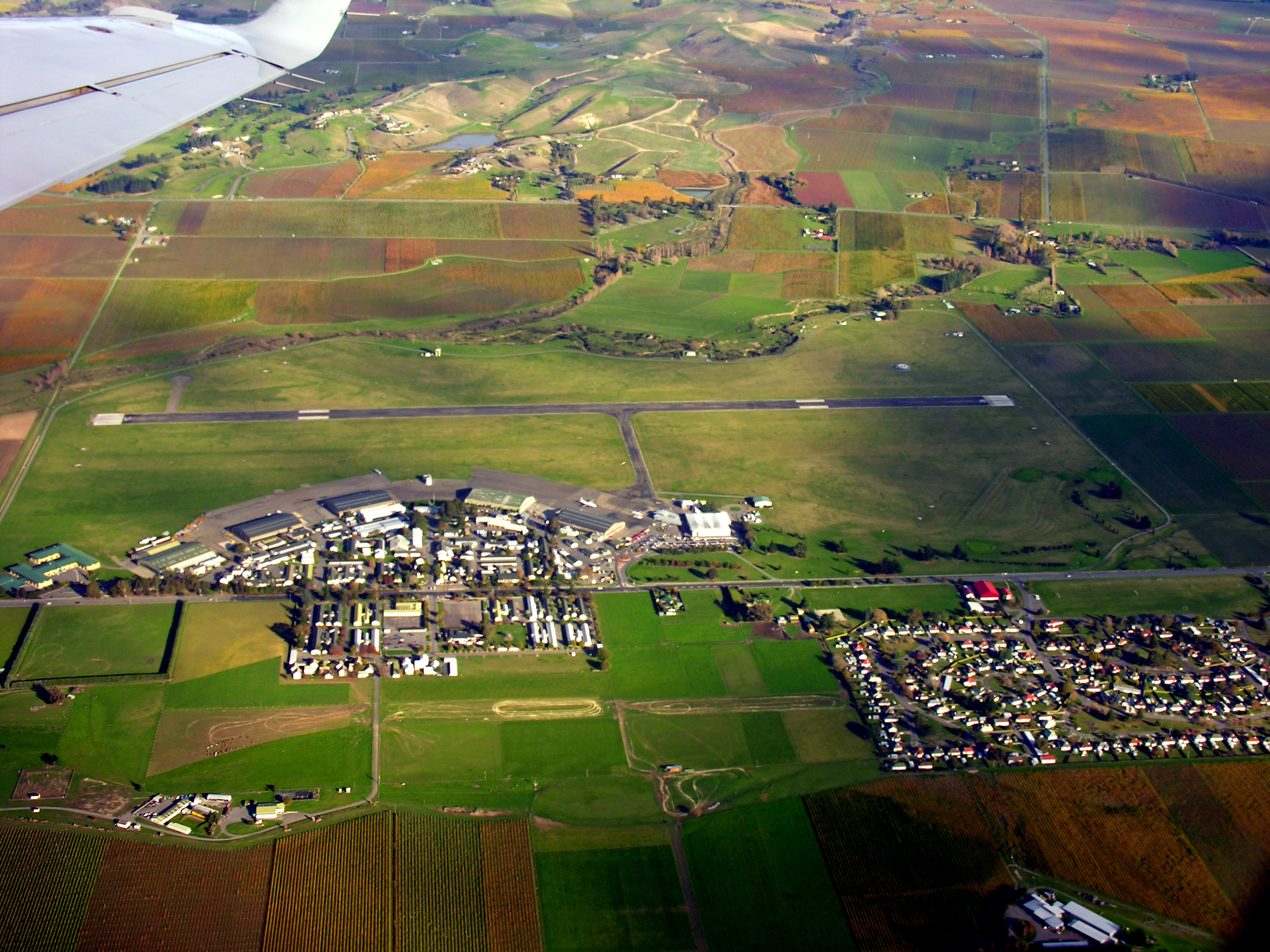
- IATA: BHE; ICAO: NZWB

Summary
- Airport type: Military/Civilian
- Owner: New Zealand Defence Force
- Operator: Royal New Zealand Air Force
- Serves: Blenheim, New Zealand
- Location: Blenheim, New Zealand
- Occupants: Command Training School; Ground Training Wing; Aircraft Repair Depot; Command Recruit Training Squadron
- Elevation AMSL: 109 ft / 33 m
- Coordinates: 41°31′06″S 173°52′13″E
- Website: www.airforce.mil.nz

Map
- Map showing RNZAF Base Woodbourne in red, and Woodbourne Airport in blue.

Runways
Direction	Length		Surface
Direction	ft	m	Surface
06R/24L	4,675	1,425	Asphalt
06L/24R	4,675	1,425	Grass
10/28	3,878	1,182	Grass

RNZAF Base Woodbourne is a base of the Royal New Zealand Air Force, located 8 km west of Blenheim. Today, Woodbourne is the Air Force's only support base and has no operational squadrons based there. It shares its runways with the Blenheim civil airport, Woodbourne Airport.

== History ==
Woodbourne was established in 1939 as the base for No. 2 Service Flying Training School (No.2 SFTS). Also located nearby during World War II were the ground training camps of the Delta. In 1942–43, No. 16 Squadron RNZAF and No. 18 Squadron RNZAF Squadrons flying Curtiss P-40 Warhawks used the satellite Fairhall field. In 1945 No.2 SFTS was closed and the Royal New Zealand Air Force Central Flying School and some ground training units, including the Officers' School of Instruction were relocated to Woodbourne. In 1949, The Aircraft Repair Depot RNZAF was relocated from Ohakea, and in 1951 the Boy Entrant School was established at Woodbourne.

The Ground Training Wing was created in 1995 from existing units at Woodbourne and those relocated from Wigram and Hobsonville, and is responsible for the training of recruits (General Service Training School), initial officer training (Command Training School), trade training (except aircrew, medical and photography training) and command training.

Woodbourne was the Air Force's only heavy maintenance facility for the repair of aircraft airframes, engines and avionics systems. This squadron was responsible for reconditioning airframes of RNZAF aircraft. It was known as the Airframe Reconditioning Squadron RNZAF. The unit was commercialised in 1998 and was managed by SAFE Air Ltd. In 2015 SAFE Air Ltd was purchased by Airbus and it continues to maintain military aircraft. SAFE Air Ltd formally relinquished the name and now trades under Airbus Asia Pacific. A notable project for Airbus was completing full refurbishment of three of the Air Force's previous C-130 Hercules. These aircraft were sold to Coulson Aviation on retirement from RNZAF service in 2024.

In 2024 the three local Māori iwi (tribes) entities Ngāti Apa ki te Rā Tō, Te Rūnanga o Ngāti Kuia and the Rangitāne o Wairau Settlement Trust decided to accept $25 million for a treaty settlement in view of the chemical contamination of the base's land. The compensation settlement was signed in early November 2024.

== Units based at Woodbourne ==
Personnel strength is around 800.

- Command Training School
- Command and Recruit Training Squadron
- Technical Training Squadron
- Mission Support Training Squadron
- Base Medical flight
- RNZAF Police
- Base Operations Squadron Woodbourne
- Directorate of Defence Security
- NZDF Physical Instructors Training School
- Defence Logistics (Air)
- Airbus Aircraft Facility (Heavy maintenance facility for the repair of aircraft airframes, engines and avionics systems)
- Nelson Marlborough Institute of Technology Aeronautical Engineering programme

== See also ==
- List of New Zealand military bases
