= RNZAF Station Te Pirita =

Former RNZAF station

Coordinates: 43.6038359°S 172.0071921°E

RNZAF Station Te Pirita was a World War II airfield, located south of the inland mid-Canterbury town of Hororata in New Zealand. Designed to accommodate United States Army Air Forces heavy bombers, at the time of its construction, it was to be the largest airfield in New Zealand, but it was never officially used.

== Construction ==
Hurriedly built in 1941–42 after the Imperial Japanese Navy's sudden attack on Pearl Harbor, Te Pirita was, at the time of its construction, New Zealand's largest airfield. As Japanese forces advanced through the Pacific during 1942, the threat of an air attack on the North Island grew and in response the New Zealand Government commandeered large tracts of land in the farming district of Te Pirita for use as a secret retreat base, which was intended to be the first in a network of bomber bases to be built in the Canterbury region.

The airfield was constructed in record time using seconded civilian and New Zealand Armed Forces engineers. Three heavy earth compacted runways up to 2,000 metres (6,600 ft) long were laid in the prevailing wind directions of the region. The runway surfaces were laid with wattle tree seeds for strength while the base was designed to handle large numbers of US Boeing Flying Fortress and Consolidated Liberator bombers.

== Initial use ==
Commissioned by the Royal New Zealand Air Force while still under construction in 1942, the airfield was initially used for air training. At least one B-17 Flying Fortress landed on the runways to test vectors. As the tide of the Pacific War turned in 1943 due to Allied victories at Guadalcanal and Papua New Guinea, the airfield was no longer required and construction of revetments, hangars and barrack blocks was halted. The plans for other bases in the region were also scrapped, although basic administration facilities remained and armed guards continued to patrol the site. The base closed in late 1943 but was held in reserve for the duration of the war. The runways were kept intact and tidy by regular mowing of their unique wattle grass.

== Hidden fuel depot ==
The airbase's aviation fuel bunker was the largest in New Zealand and was located at Bankside, beside the north bank of the Rakaia River next to the Main South Line Railway. Well camouflaged by pine trees, the inground, steel roofed cylindrical brick bunker was served by a hidden rail siding. The fuel capacity was estimated at 700,000 imperial gallons. The bunker also served the nearby and more visible RNZAF Norwood satellite airbase.

== Abandonment and remains ==
Eventually the airfield was abandoned and left to return to nature. The wattle grass soon grew into bushes and then into full size trees. This allowed the airfield site to be easily spotted from the air as late as 2006 with perfect runway layouts created by the overgrowth. Intensive sheep farming returned to the region and most traces of the base began to disappear. In the early 21st century a dairy boom took over most of the flat mid-Canterbury region including Te Pirita. By late 2010, three large rotary method dairy farms sat over the site of the airbase and most of the wattle tree-sown runways finally vanished, although the general layout of the runways are still vaguely visible.

After years hidden in a small stand of its camouflage pines, and after years of use as a local rubbish dump, the bunker site has been completely cleaned up, and exposed. The trees were cut down in 2008 and the local council now owns and maintains the site.
