= Piva Airfield =

- Piva, Bougainville Island

Site information
- Type: Military Airfield
- Controlled by: United States Army Air Forces; United States Marine Corps; Royal New Zealand Air Force
- Condition: Abandoned

Location
- Coordinates: 06°12′18″S 155°04′00″E

Site history
- Built: 1943-4
- Built by: Seebees
- In use: 1944–88
- Materials: Marsden Matting over sand
- Battles/wars: Bougainville Campaign

Piva Airfield is a former World War II airfield on Bougainville Island in the Solomon Islands archipelago.

== History ==
=== World War II ===
The 3rd Marine Division landed on Bougainville on 1 November 1943 at the start of the Bougainville Campaign, establishing a beachhead around Cape Torokina. Small detachments of the 25th, 53rd, 71st and 75th Naval Construction Battalions landed with the Marines and the 71st Battalion was tasked with establishing a small fighter airfield that would become Torokina Airfield.

On 26 November 1943 the 36th Naval Construction Battalion arrived on Bougainville and on 29 November they started work on a 8,000 feet (2,400 m) by 30 feet (9.1 m) bomber strip. The first plane landed on the bomber strip on 19 December and it was put into operation on 30 December, after several weeks of operation it was extended by an additional 2,000 feet (610 m). The 71st Battalion built three taxiways with 35 hardstands, a shop area, seven nose hangars, three prefabricated steel huts, and 26 frame buildings. Aviation camps consisted of a 5,000-man camp for Marine Aircraft Group 24. The 77th Battalion arrived on Bougainville on 10 December 1943 and began constructing a fighter airfield parallel to the bomber field. The airfield was completed on 3 January and the first plane landed on 9 January. Several weeks later, the 77th Battalion was instructed to extend the strip by 2,000 feet (610 m). Both airfields were connected by taxiways and shared fuel tank farms and other facilities. The construction of the airfields frequently took place under Japanese harassing fire such as the Bougainville counterattack, as the US forces never sought to occupy the entire island.

The bomber airfield became known as Piva 1, Piva North Airfield, Piva Uncle Airfield or Piva Bomber Strip while the fighter airfield became known as Piva 2, Piva South Airfield, Piva Yoke Airfield or Piva Fighter Strip.

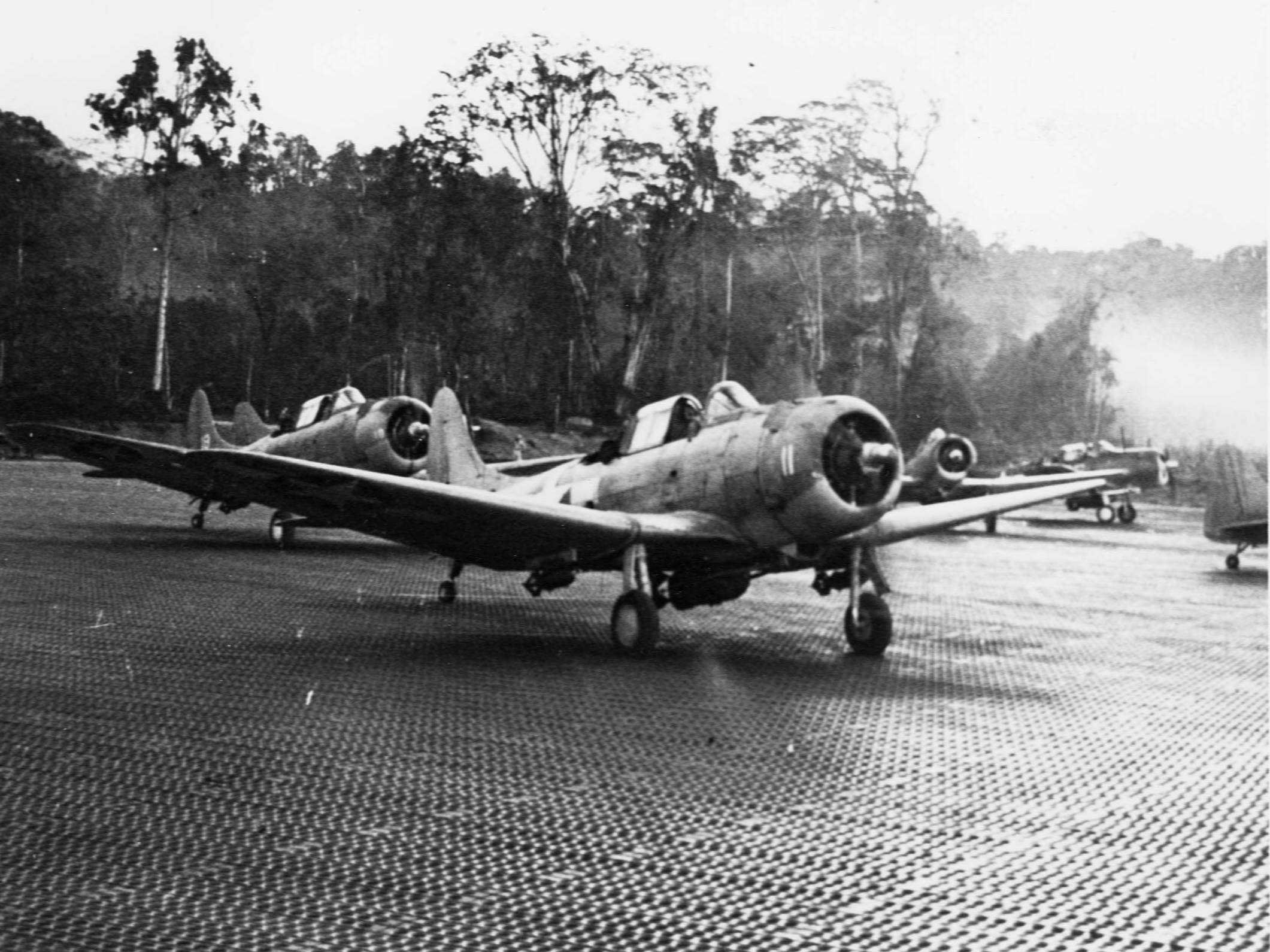
SBDs of VC-40 sortie from Piva Uncle Airfield for a strike on Rabaul, 6 April 1944

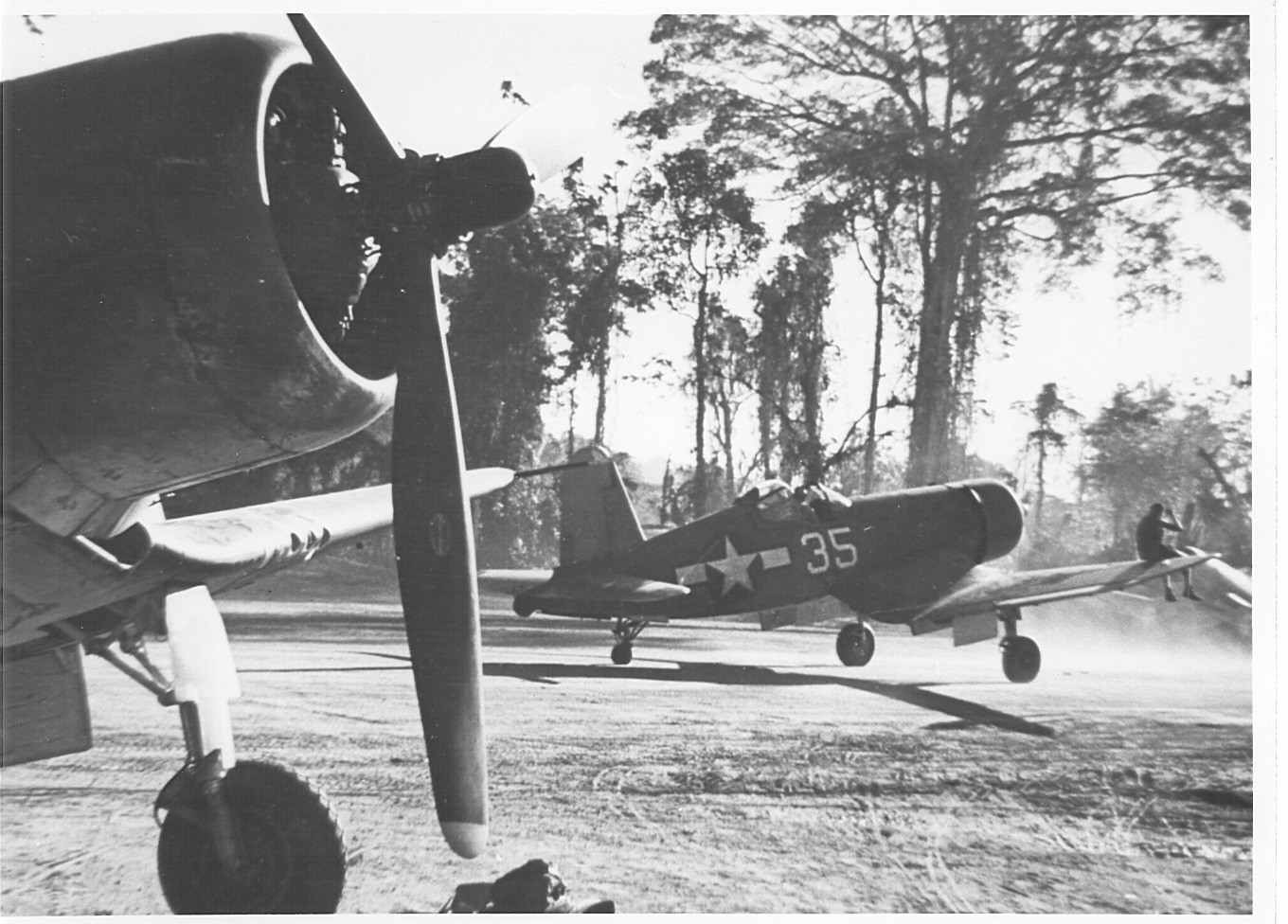
F4Us of VF-17 at Piva, February 1944

US Navy units based at Piva included:

- 30 TB Squadron operating TBFs from 23 March 1944
- VT-305 operating TBFs 1944
- VB-305 operating SBDs 1944
- VF-17 operating F4Us

USMC units based at Piva included:

- 1st Marine Air Wing HQ
- VMF-212 operating F4Fs from 20 January-20 March 1944
- VMF-215 operating F4Us
- VMD-254 (photo lab detachment) 16 January 1944
- VMF(N)-531 operating PV-1 Venturas

RAAF units based at Piva included:

- 5 Squadron operating Wirraways and Boomerangs

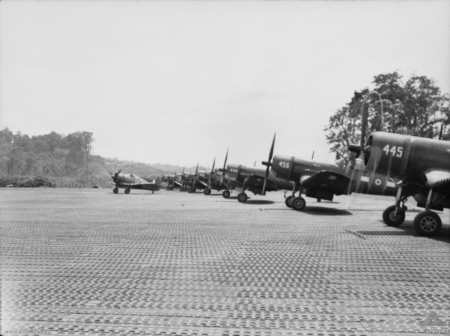
RAAF Boomerang with RNZAF Corsairs at Piva in January 1945

RNZAF units based at Piva included:

- 3 Squadron operating PV-1s from August 1944
- 9 Squadron operating PV-1s from May–August 1944
- 15 Squadron operating F4Us from May–June 1944 and January–April 1945
- 20 Squadron operating F4Us from May–June 1944 and January–April 1945
- 21 Squadron operating F4Us from July-September 1944
- 23 Squadron operating F4Us from October–November 1944
- 24 Squadron operating F4Us October 1945
- 25 Squadron operating SBDs from 23 March 1944
- 30 Squadron operating TBFs from March – May 1944
- 31 Squadron operating TBFs from May - July 1944

On 30 January 1944 an F4U of VF-17, flown by Lt.(j.g.) Doug Gutenkunst, collided with an FG1 of VMF-211 over Piva Bomber Strip, both planes were destroyed and both pilots killed.

On 8 March 1944 Japanese artillery opened up on Piva Airfield and destroyed one B-24 Liberator and three fighters and damaged nineteen other aircraft.

By early 1945 base roll-up and salvage operations had commenced and were completed by the end of June 1945.

=== Postwar ===
The bomber airfield remains usable as Torokina Airport (IATA: TOK) (not to be confused with Torokina Airfield), while the fighter airfield is completely overgrown with vegetation.

== See also ==
- Torokina Airfield
- United States Army Air Forces in the South Pacific Area
