= Air Force Museum of New Zealand =

Military and Aviation Museum in Christchurch, New Zealand

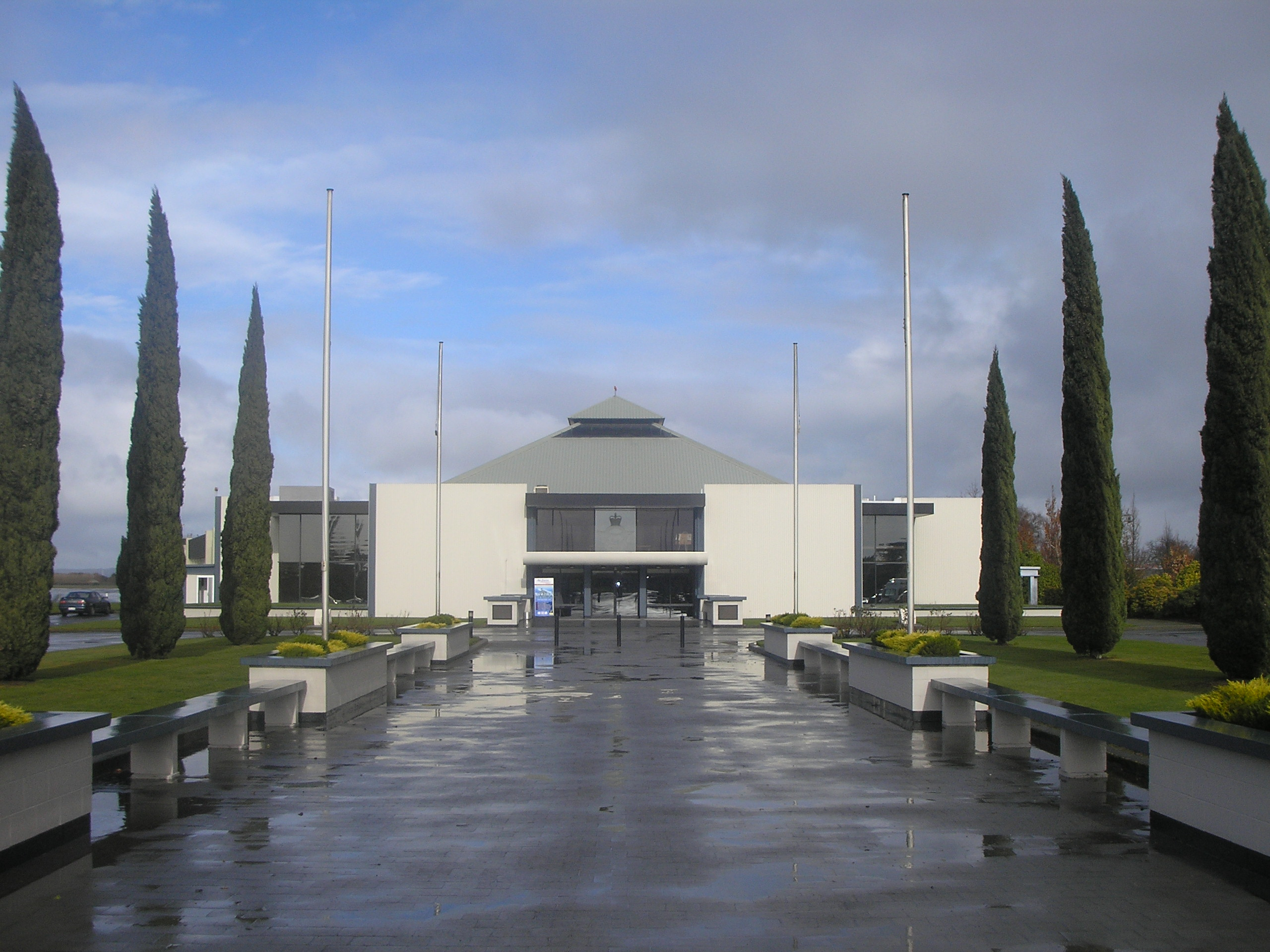
- Museum entrance

- Location within Christchurch, New Zealand
- Former name: Royal New Zealand Air Force Museum
- Location: Wigram, Christchurch
- Coordinates: 43.5466°S 172.5477°E
- Website: airforcemuseum.co.nz

The Air Force Museum of New Zealand, formerly called The Royal New Zealand Air Force Museum, is located at Wigram, the RNZAF's first operational base, in Christchurch, in the South Island of New Zealand. It opened on 1 April 1987 as part of the celebrations for the RNZAF's 50th anniversary, and is primarily a museum of the Royal New Zealand Air Force, its predecessor, the New Zealand Permanent Air Force and New Zealand squadrons of the Royal Air Force. The Air Force Museum of New Zealand's mission is to preserve and present the history of New Zealand military aviation for commemoration, learning, inspiration and enjoyment.

== Overview ==
The Museum holds the national collection of the Royal New Zealand Air Force. The collection includes objects covering the early days of New Zealand military aviation both prior to World War I and during this major conflict, the interwar years which saw the formation of the RNZAF in 1937, New Zealanders who fought in the RAF and in other Allied air forces during World War II, the RNZAF's campaign in the Pacific, and the post-war period to the present day. The collection also includes objects from former enemy forces, aircraft, aircraft components, aircraft engines, large objects, textiles, art and memorabilia as well as an extensive paper and photographic archive.

Visitors can take a 40-minute guided tour through 'behind the scenes' areas of the museum, which includes the Reserve Collection hangar. The museum's most recent restoration project, an Airspeed Oxford, is now on public display since February 2016. The museum also has a Mosquito Flight Simulator, which features a mission based on the Allied bombing of German battleships in the Norwegian fiords.

== History ==
In response to the 2011 earthquake, the museum opened its collections storage facility to other cultural institutions that had been damaged.

The museum opened a new 6,500 m^{2} (70,000 sq ft) Technology Centre in February 2017.

The museum's Canberra was transported to Ardmore for restoration and conversion to a B(I).12 variant in 2021.

In 2023 NZ4203, a Lockheed P-3K2 Orion was transported by road to the museum from RNZAF Base Woodbourne.

On 19 February 2025 NZ7001, the only RNZAF C-130H Hercules to be conserved, was flown in to the museum.

The museum announced plans to build a new extension to house the Hercules and Orion in 2025, and on 26 June 2025 the Christchurch City Council announced it had approved a $5 million grant to support the project in the 2026/2027 financial year.

== Aircraft ==
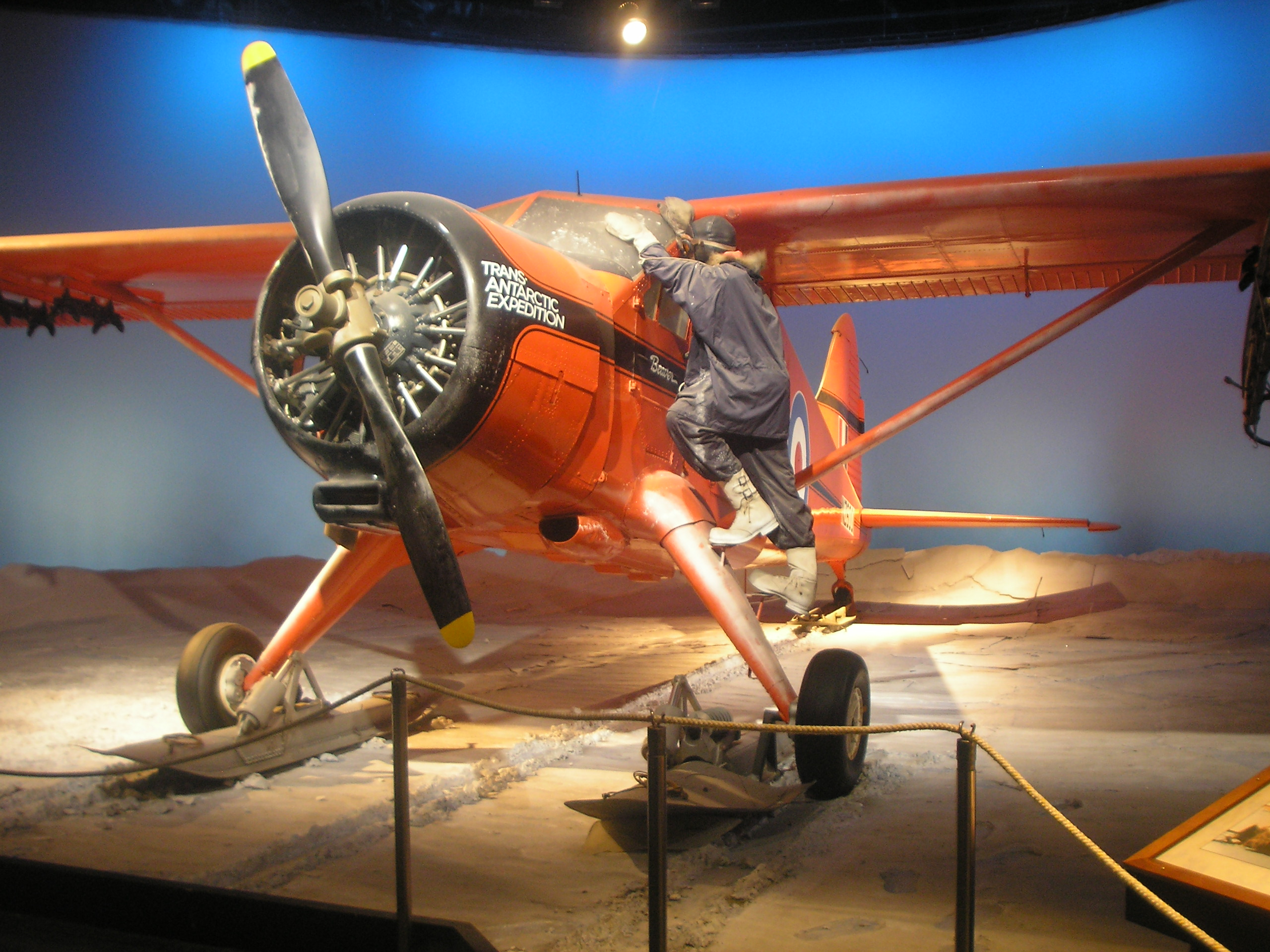
The DHC-2 Beaver

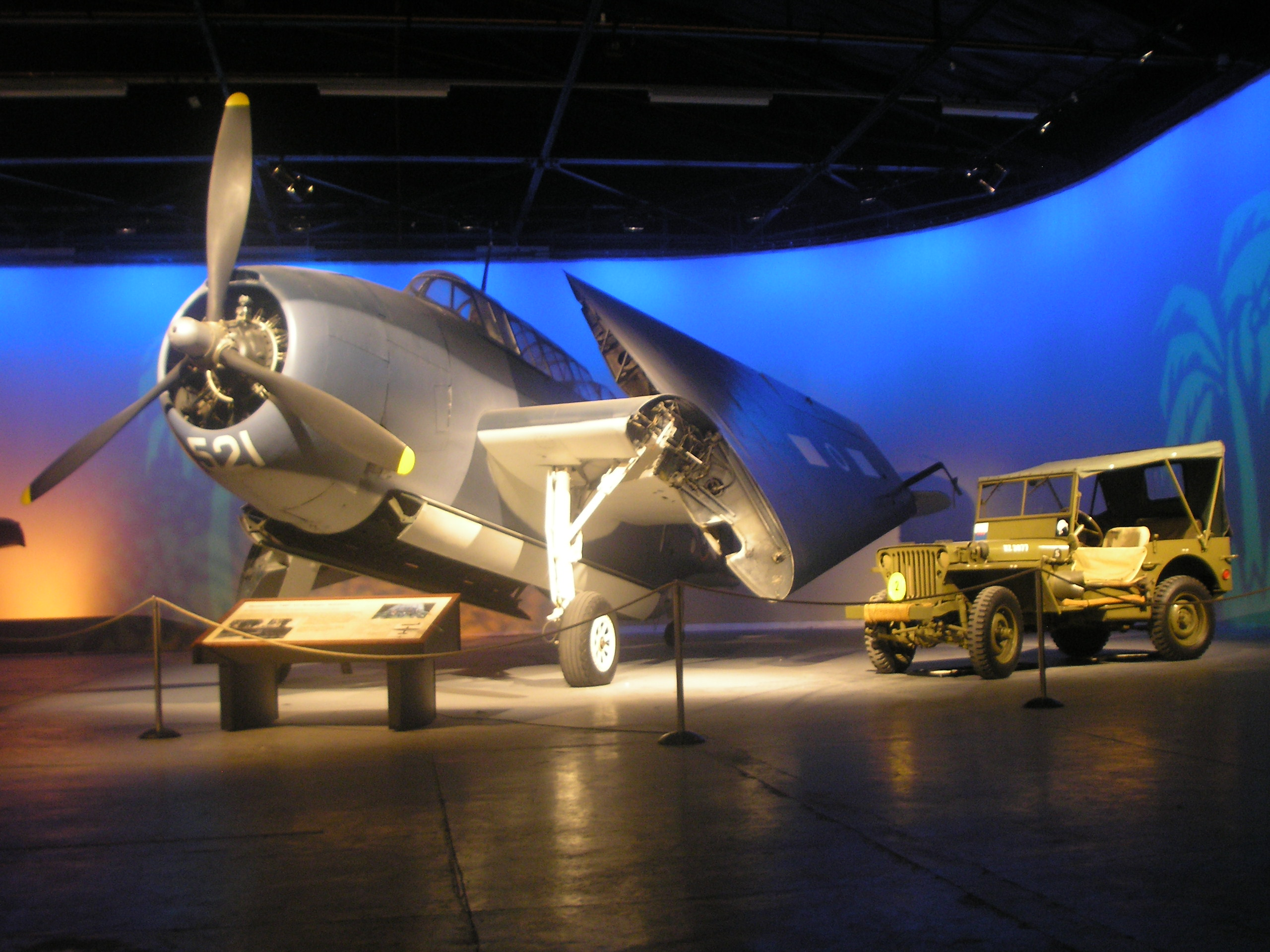
Grumman Avenger

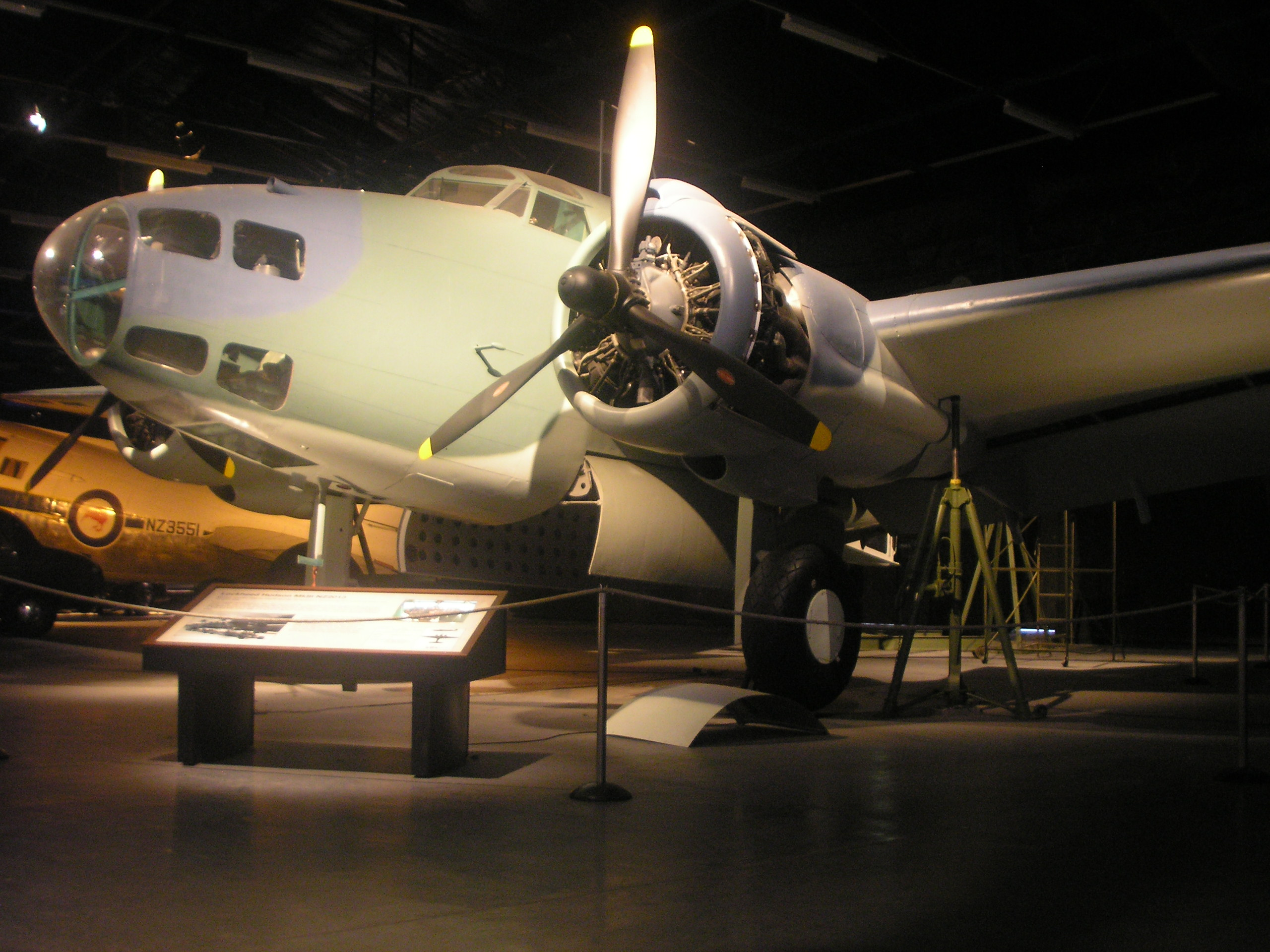
The Hudson

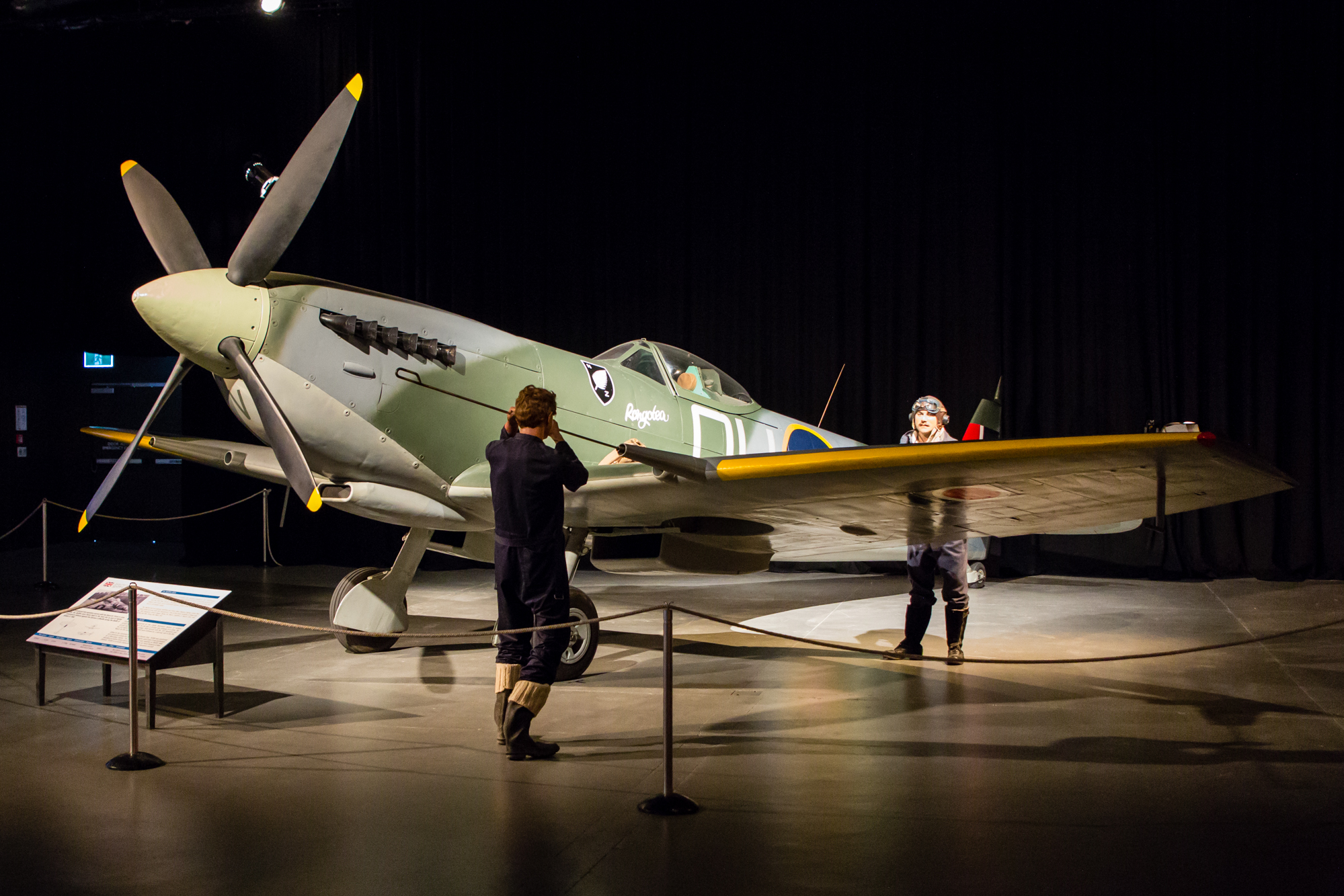
Spitfire TE288

- Aermacchi MB-339CB NZ6460
- Airspeed Oxford PK286
- Auster T.7 NZ1707
- Avro 626 NZ203
- Avro Anson Composite
- BAC Strikemaster NZ6373
- Bell 47G-3 Sioux NZ3705
- Bell UH-1H Iroquois 69-15923
- Bell UH-1H Iroquois NZ3801
- Bleriot XI "Britannia" – Replica
- Boeing 727 NZ7272 – Forward fuselage, engine, main undercarriage
- Bristol Freighter Mk 31M NZ5903
- Cessna O-2A Skymaster 69-7639
- Curtiss P-40F Kittyhawk 41-14205
- de Havilland DH.82A Tiger Moth NZ1481
- de Havilland Vampire FB.5 NZ5757
- de Havilland Vampire T.11 NZ5710
- de Havilland Devon NZ1803
- de Havilland Canada DHC-2 Beaver 1084
- Douglas C-47B Dakota NZ3551
- GAF Canberra B.20 A84-240
- Grumman TBF-1C Avenger NZ2504
- Hawker Siddeley Andover C.1 NZ7621
- Kaman SH-2F Seasprite NZ3442
- Lockheed Hudson III NZ2013
- Lockheed P-3K2 Orion NZ4203
- Lockheed C-130H Hercules NZ7001
- McDonnell Douglas A-4C Skyhawk NZ6205
- McDonnell Douglas A-4K Skyhawk NZ6207
- McDonnell Douglas TA-4K Skyhawk NZ6254
- North American Harvard III NZ1087
- North American P-51 Mustang F-367
- Pacific Aerospace CT-4B Airtrainer NZ1948
- Sopwith Pup – Replica
- Supermarine Spitfire XVI TE288
- Westland Wasp HAS.1 NZ3906

=== Under restoration ===
- Canadian Vickers PBV-1A Catalina 44-34081
- Vickers Vildebeest/Vincent NZ102/NZ124/NZ105/NZ355/NZ357
