= Wigram Aerodrome =

Closed airport in Christchurch, New Zealand

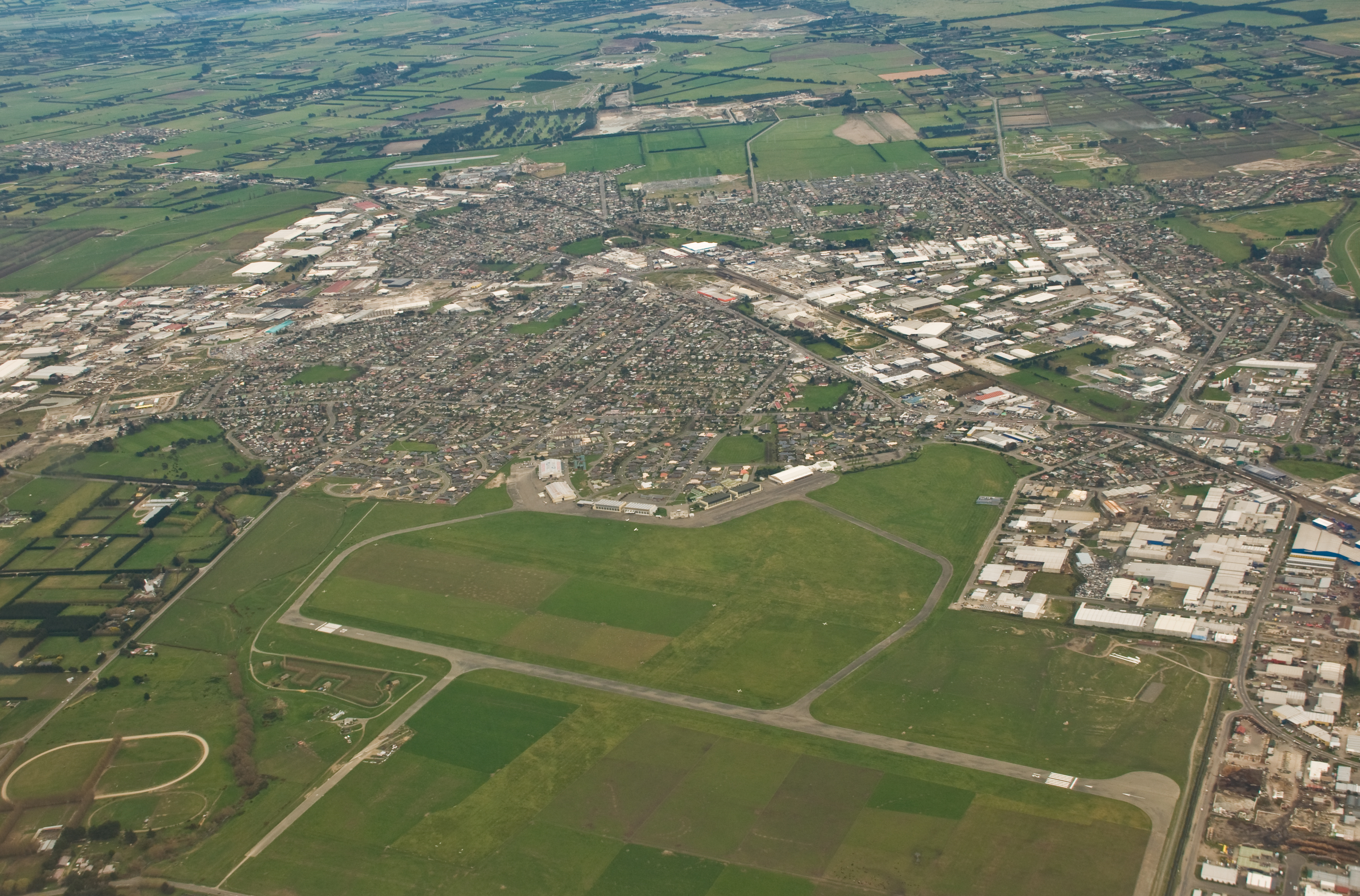
- IATA: none; ICAO: ~~NZWG~~

Summary
- Airport type: Public
- Operator: Wigram Aerodrome Ltd.
- Serves: Christchurch
- Location: Wigram
- Elevation AMSL: 74 ft (23 m)
- Coordinates: 43°33′04″S 172°33′10″E

Map
- Location of Wigram Aerodrome

Runways
Direction	Length		Surface
Direction	ft	m	Surface
~~03R/21L~~ (Closed)	~~5,184~~	~~1,580~~	~~Asphalt~~
~~03L/21R~~ (Closed)	~~3,291~~	~~1,003~~	~~Grass~~
~~13/31~~ (Closed)	~~3,445~~	~~1,050~~	~~Grass~~

RNZAF Base Wigram
- Active: 1917–1995
- Country: New Zealand
- Branch: Royal New Zealand Air Force
- Type: Training base
- Mottos: Latin: In Deo Et In Alis Salus ("Safety is in God and our wings")
- Colors: Red and black

Wigram Aerodrome (ICAO: NZWG) is located in the Christchurch suburb of Sockburn, later to be split-suburb of Wigram and now split again as Wigram Skies. It was given by Sir Henry Wigram for the Canterbury (NZ) Aviation Company on 20 September 1916 and originally named Sockburn Airport.

In 1923 that was then given to the Crown as a Royal New Zealand Air Force base. The base, and the airfield, was named RNZAF (Royal New Zealand Air Force) Station (or Base) Wigram.

Charles Kingsford Smith made the first trans-Tasman flight from Sydney to Wigram on 10 September 1928.

Sir Henry Wigram continued to support the base, giving a further 81 acres of land in 1932. However, aircraft got larger, and needed longer and eventually tarsealed runways. The Crown added to the original size of the airfield, and that addition was land belonging to Ngāi Tahu. That just includes where the control tower currently still stands.

RNZAF Wigram was home to the Central Flying School, Pilot Training Squadron, Navigation Training and recruit training.

In 1953 RNZAF Wigram was the scene of the worst RNZAF crash in New Zealand when two RNZAF De Havilland Devon collided coming in to land; seven men were killed.

In the 1990s, the government wanted to rationalise their military property and a decision was made to either close Wigram or RNZAF Woodbourne near Blenheim. Despite the fact that it had just been renovated at great expense, it was decided to close Wigram. The aircraft and squadrons moved to RNZAF Ohakea and recruit training went to Woodbourne. The closing parade was held on 14 September 1995.

Wigram Aerodrome maintained its aviation character, with several aviation businesses using its facilities. These included Pionair Private Aircharter, Christchurch Parachute School and Christchurch Flying School. Three Air Training Corps units, and a Cadet Corps unit also presently occupy buildings within the aerodrome.

Christchurch's Air Force Museum of New Zealand is located at the northern side of the aerodrome. It houses a large collection of aircraft and interactive displays, and is the only museum of the RNZAF in New Zealand.

Wigram Airfield Circuit was a temporary motor racing circuit at the Wigram Airfield. The temporary motor racing circuit was 3 km (1.9 mi) long and considered as the oldest motor race circuit in New Zealand since it had been racing in 1949.

The RNZAF still owns the original gifted part of the airfield, which is now the home of the Air Force Museum of New Zealand. The majority of the airfield, control tower, hangars and new fire station was returned to Ngāi Tahu Property as part of a treaty settlement claim. The fire station became the home of the civilian fire service until 2018. Since 2008 the Ngāi Tahu land is the suburb of Wigram Skies.

== Closure ==
In 1997, housing developer Ngāi Tahu Property purchased the Wigram site with plans of constructing a masterplanned suburb. On 9 July 2008, Television 3 News broadcast a news item stating that Ngāi Tahu, the owners of the aerodrome (acquired as part of a Treaty of Waitangi settlement claim), would close Wigram Aerodrome by February 2009. Wigram Airfield officially ceased operation as an airfield at 00:00 Sunday 1 March 2009 NZ Local time.

=== Redevelopment ===
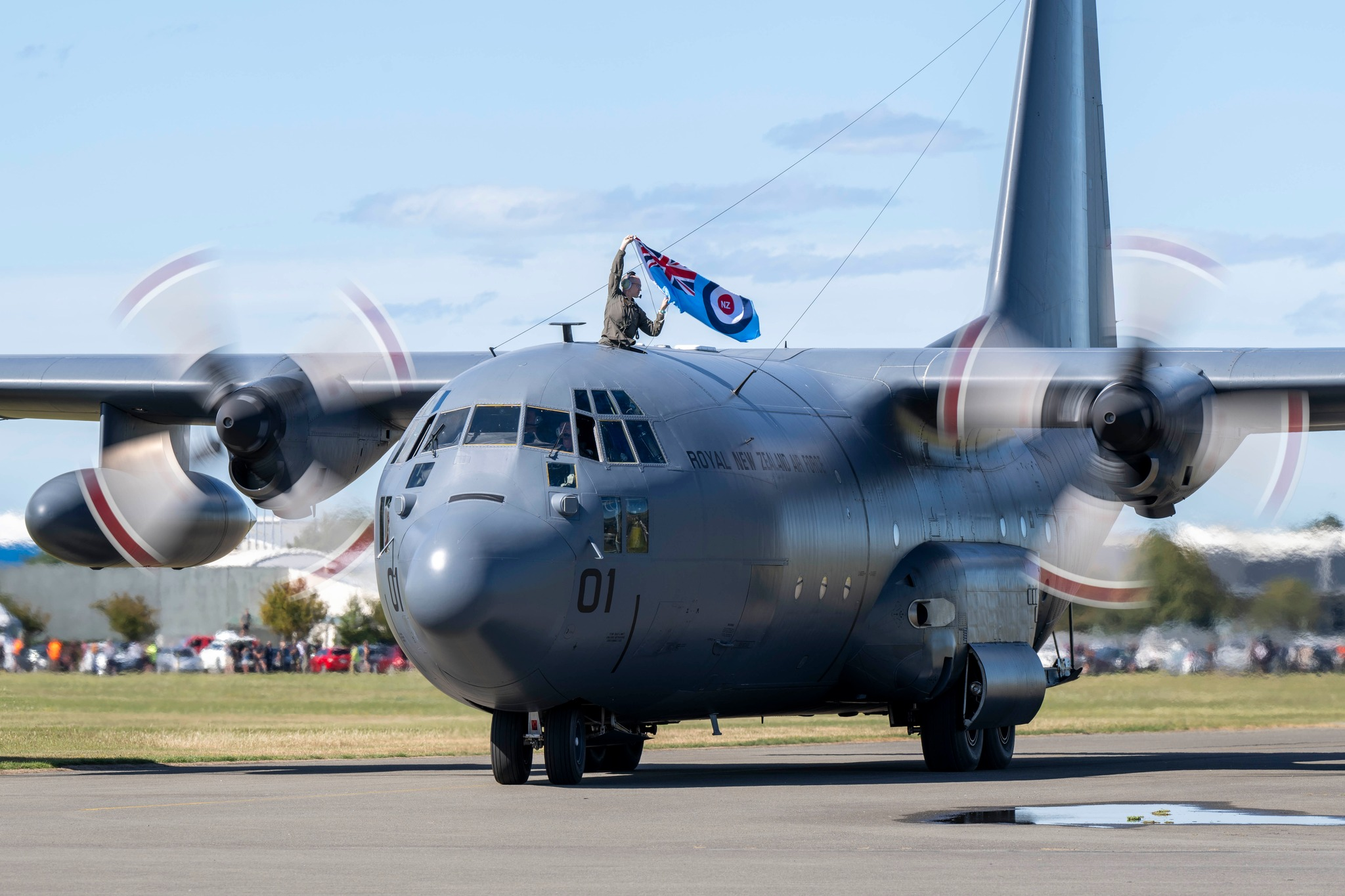
NZ7001, the first C-130H Hercules flown by the RNZAF, retires to the Air Force Museum in Wigram, 2025.

Following closure, the developer began construction of the Wigram aerodrome site in late 2009. Named Wigram Skies, the development proposes 1600 residential sections, a shopping centre, and an industrial area in the east adjoining the existing industrial area. The aerodrome's old sealed runway forms the development's main street, aptly named the Runway, with other street names having an aviation, flight or sky theme. The historic control tower and hangars remain.

After the Christchurch earthquakes of February 2011 resulted in much of the Central Business District being off limits due to the office buildings being damaged, destroyed, or inaccessible, Ngāi Tahu moved its offices to the Wigram site using a mix of prefabricated relocatable buildings and a refurbished control tower building to house most of its staff until a permanent long-term solution could be found. On 19 February 2025, RNZAF No.40 Squadron successfully landed C-130H Hercules NZ7001 on the remaining field of former Base Wigram. NZ7001 was selected for retirement to the Air Force Museum of New Zealand following the types replacement with newer C-130J Super Hercules. It was the first landing at former Base Wigram in 16 years and likely the last fixed wing flight to operate from former Base Wigram.
