= RNZAF Dip Flat =

Training facility of the Royal New Zealand Air Force

Coordinates: 41°53′39″S 172°55′17″E

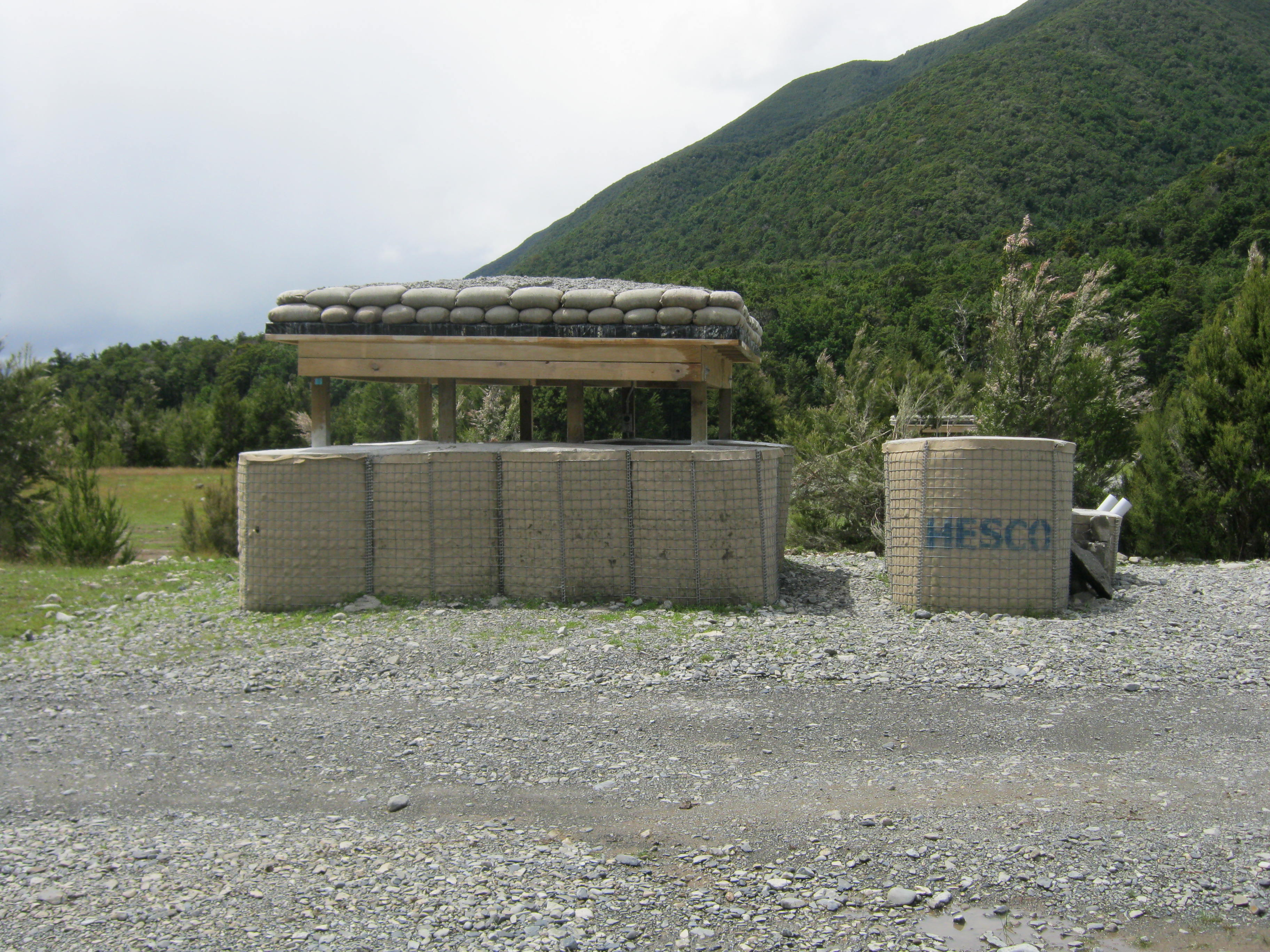
HESCO Fortification at RNZAF Dip Flat

RNZAF Dip Flat is the field training facility and mountain flying training area of the Royal New Zealand Air Force.

Located at the base of the Saint Arnaud Range at the eastern boundary of Nelson Lakes National Park in the South Island of New Zealand, on the banks of the Wairau River, Dip Flat serves to train recruits from CRTS (Command and Recruit Training Squadron) in "out-in-the-field" practical military training.

Recruits usually do a ten-day stint at Dip Flat as part of their Thirteen-week Basic Training. While there, they learn the basics of setting up camp, radio communication, obstacle courses, river crossings, land navigation, military patrols, night and daytime patrols and interdiction, camouflage training, rifle range exercises, and three days "on patrol" practical training away from Dip Flat to mark the end of the ten-day stint (a rough equivalent of the United States Marine Crucible).

New Zealand Cadet Forces cadets and officers also make use of Dip Flat in their annual week-long bush craft training camps which take place each January. Both Cadets and Officers achieve Mountain Safety Council qualifications as outdoor instructors.

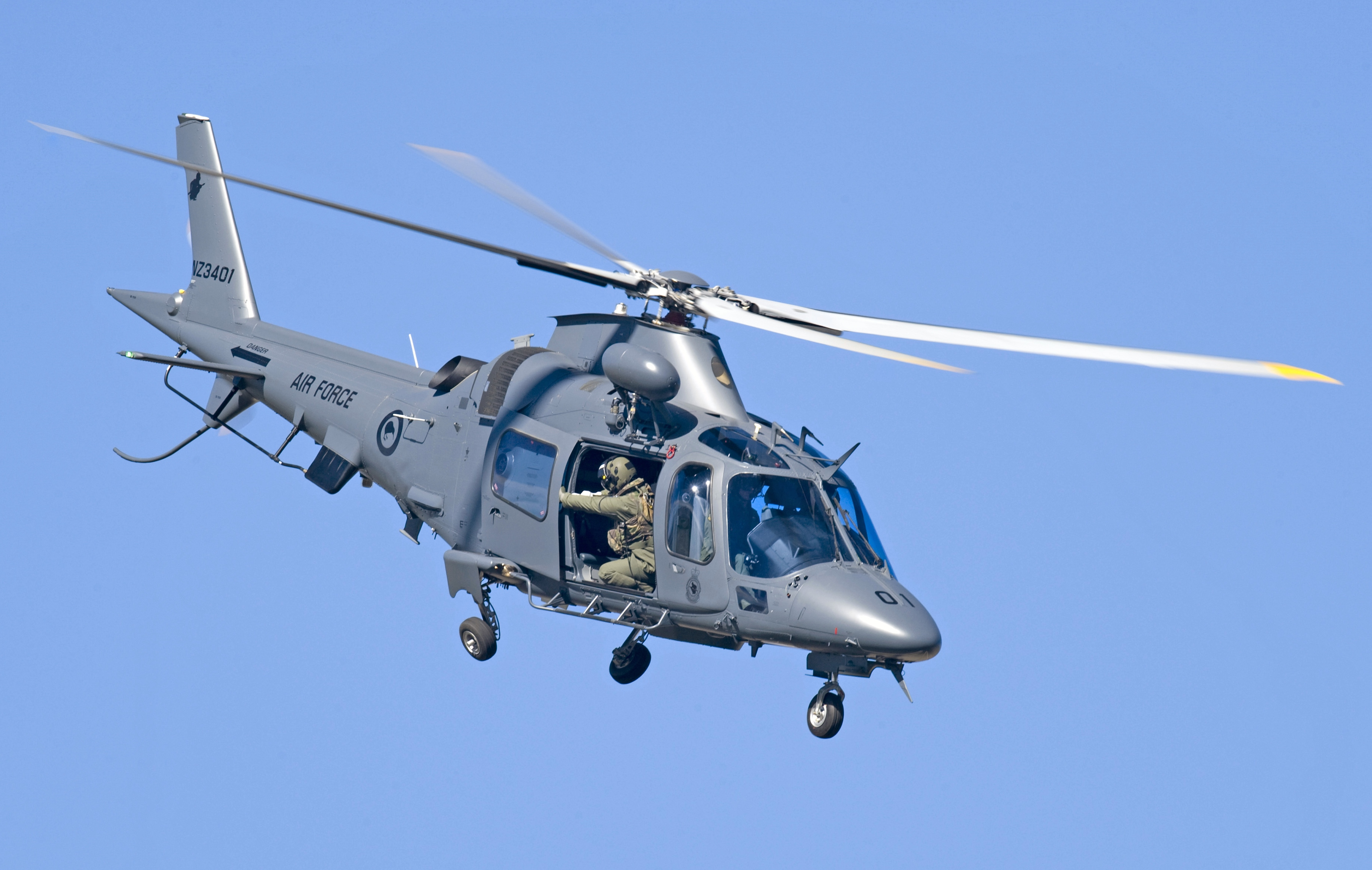
An AgustaWestland A109 helicopter being flown by members of No. 3 Squadron, 2012

RNZAF No. 3 Squadron regularly use Dip Flat for their mountain flying training. From time to time the Australian Army has also used the area to practice mountain flying in their UH-60 Blackhawks with the RNZAF. There is an annual training exercise named "Blackbird" for this and other helicopter squadrons.

Dip Flat was a stop on a stock driving track from the East to the West coast of the South Island. Dip Flat was one of the dipping stops on the route.

Dip Flat is also known as Dry Valley or Valley of the dry. Temperatures in the summer can be very hot, often exceeding 30 degrees Celsius with hot north west winds. The winters are extremely cold often with heavy snow, and temperatures fall well below zero degrees.

The area can receive huge amounts of heavy rainfall due to the close proximity of the Saint Arnaud Range, and many roads and fords become impassible.

Dip Flat has also been used for search and rescue training for the New Zealand Police.
