= Russian Scare =

Fears of Russian invasion of New Zealand

The Russian Scare was a period in the history of New Zealand, from 1870 to 1885, during which at least six separate incidents occurred that led to popular fear that New Zealand would be invaded by Russia. Despite significant public panic, neither contemporary evidence nor archival modern evidence supports that Russia ever planned to attack New Zealand. Rather, a combination of isolation and neglect from colonial overlord Britain, the Great Game, nascent nationalism, erroneous reports of foreign vessels, and outright hoaxes led to a prolonged period of paranoia.

== Background ==
The world in 1871; the Russian Empire in blue, the British Empire (including New Zealand) in light red

In the 1870s New Zealand was a young self-governing colony of the United Kingdom. It had developed no coastal defences of any consequence and was becoming increasingly sensitive to how vulnerable its harbours were to attack by a hostile power or opportunistic raider. Fears of invasion by the expanding Russian Empire were common, especially due to the founding of Russia's Pacific port at Vladivostok. While the British Navy was among the world's strongest, local British sea power was lacking; ten or fewer ships were assigned to the entirety of Australia and New Zealand during the 1860s. New Zealand military planners were keenly aware that they lacked sufficient coastal defenses or naval power to hold off an attack by a foreign power.

Russophobia was also high in 19th century New Zealand. Many anti-Russian novels, newspaper articles, and other works were published in New Zealand.

In 1871, very few Russian ships were even remotely close to New Zealand; only four Russian ships were operating within 3,000 mi (4,800 km). Just one Russian warship had visited Australia in the 1860s.

Still, Russia and the United Kingdom were playing the Great Game. The two nations battled in the Crimean War from 1853 to 1856. During the 1860s, Russia had expanded deeply into Central Asia, raising fears of a clash over Britain's possessions in India. New Zealanders feared that a clash between Russia and the UK would put a target on their isolated island.

== Scares ==
Whatever the cause, government efforts to strengthen New Zealand against Russian attack picked up notably in the early 1870s. Governor George Bowen, a noted Russophobe, repeatedly wrote to John Wodehouse, Secretary of State for the Colonies, regarding New Zealand's tenuous position in the event of a Great Powers conflict. Bowen requested additional weapons, and eventually conversation turned to the subject of Russia.

Erroneous reports began to inflate fears among the government. In a July 1871 dispatch from Bowen to Wodehouse, Bowen included a communique that claimed that a Russian corvette had been prowling in New Zealand the year before with the intent to attack New Zealand, when war seemed possible between Russia and the UK. But the only Russian ship that had actually been near was the Russian corvette Vityaz, which was circumnavigating the world and had stopped in New Guinea to disembark scientist Nicholas Miklouho-Maclay. Nevertheless, public speculation went wild and concluded that the Vitayz was there so as to cut off mail service to Britain.

But naval intelligence never indicated that Russia was considering an attack. The Russians had not dispatched ships to the south Pacific, nor did they appear to have plans to—nor does modern archival research indicate that such plans ever existed.

The connection of Australia to Britain via telegraph in 1872 greatly sped up the rate of news transmission, which had previously taken a month via ship to arrive to the colonies, and heightened the potential for scares.

=== 1873 hoax ===
Part of a hoax article run in the Daily Southern Cross, 17 February 1873, falsely proclaiming war with Russia. Its four tier headline, indicating great newsworthiness, was almost unprecedented.

Fears intensified after David Luckie, editor of the Daily Southern Cross, ran a fanciful hoax article on 17 February 1873. The article proclaimed that war had been declared between England and Russia, and that a fictional Russian naval cruiser, the Kaskowiski (a wordplay on "cask of whiskey"), had attacked Auckland.

[The Kaskowiski] – whose very name should have made sober readers suspicious – had allegedly entered Auckland Harbour on the previous Saturday night and proceeded to capture a British ship, along with the city's arms and ammunition supply, and hold a number of leading citizens for ransom. The 954-man Russian vessel obviously meant business, with a dozen 30-ton guns as well as a remarkably new advance in warfare, a paralysing and deadly "water-gas" that could be injected into enemy ships from a great distance.

The article, in small print, clarified that the whole thing was a hoax and that no such horrors had come to pass. But many Aucklanders didn't read past the headline, and panic gripped the city. Luckie, who had long bemoaned the unreadiness of New Zealand's defences, was pleased with the effect and felt that he had achieved his goal of alerting New Zealanders to the risk of foreign invasion. The paper published a disavowal and explanation of the hoax the next day, on 18 February 1873.

The Southern Cross article created panic and the Government commissioned its first reports on the colony's defences. It was now clearly understood that Britain would protect its territories and vital shipping routes, but the defence of individual ports was the responsibility of each self-governing colony.

=== Tensions with Russia ===
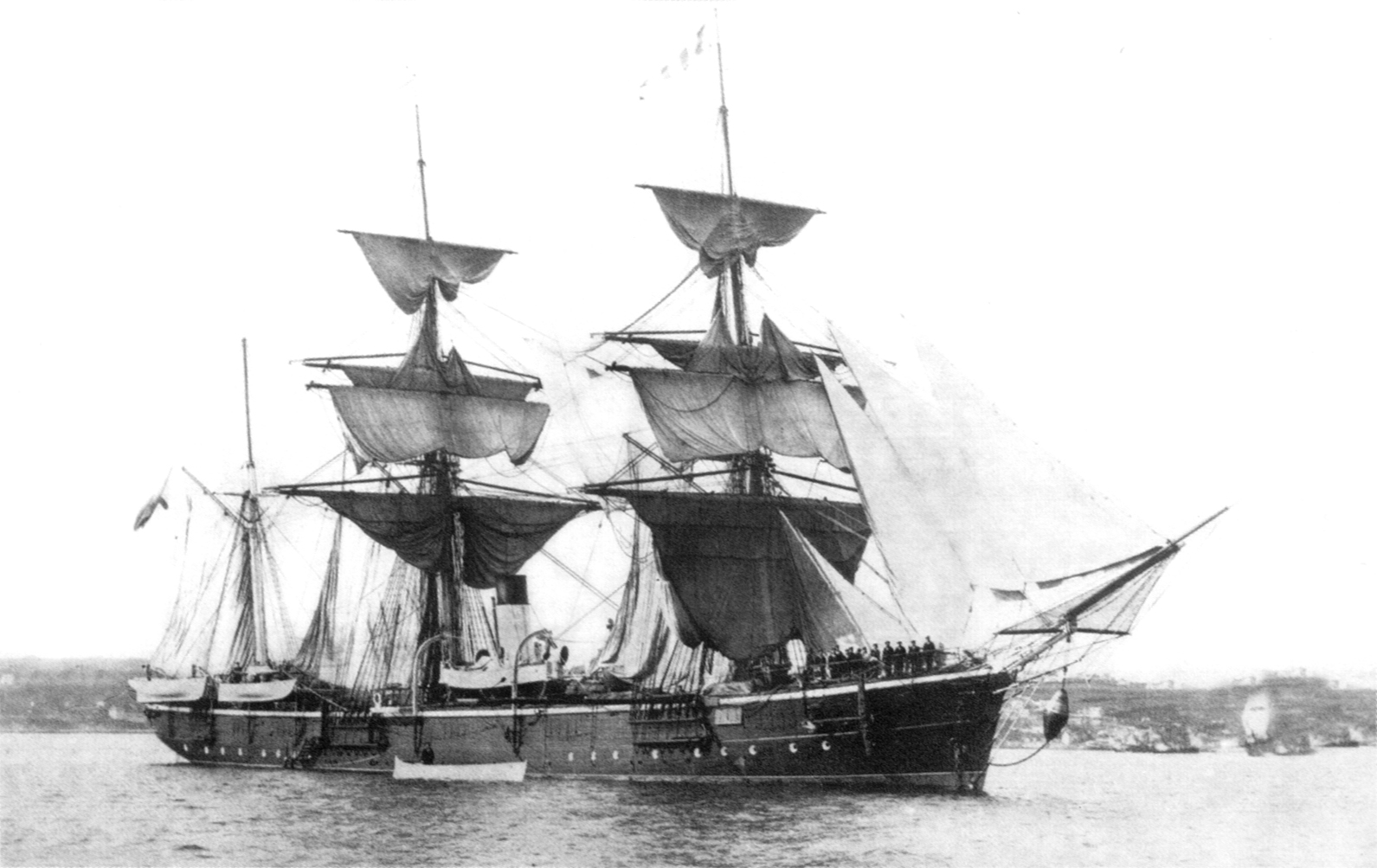
The Vestnik, part of the 1881 Russian squadron that visited Australia

The next few scares were based on geopolitical events

Russia declared war on the Ottoman Empire in 1877. While Britain was officially neutral, Britain was nearly dragged into war in 1878 when the Russians, violating the terms of a truce with the Ottomans, marched to take Constantinople. The British sent a fleet to intimidate the Russians, forcing their way through the Dardanelles, pushing both countries to the brink of war and causing another scare.

New Zealanders found cause for concern in 1881, when Russia completed its conquest of what is now Turkmenistan with victory at the Battle of Geok Tepe. The same year, a Russian squadron (the Vestnik, Afrika, and the Plastun) sailed to Australia under the command of Avraamy Aslanbegov, which further projected Russian power.

Map of Central Asia. The Russian capture of Geok Tepe (1881), Merv (1884), and Panjdeh (1885) (all highlighted) were key events in the Great Game, and brought Russia to the doorstep of Afghanistan, within Britain's sphere of influence

Fears of Russia were voiced at the 1881 Colonial Defence Conference, held in Sydney, where delegates seriously considered the idea of a home-grown Australian-New Zealand colonial navy. However, New Zealand ultimately did not commit to an Australasian navy, perhaps worrying that such a navy would be anchored in Australia. New Zealand instead pledged volunteers to any potential British-Russian war, and continued to implore the British for additional naval support.

The 1884 conquest of Merv also caused concern, bringing Russia to the doorstep of Afghanistan.

=== Defenses and the final scare ===
Tensions over Afghanistan helped lead to the preparation of coastal defenses. An 1884 report by Sir William Jervois, the Governor of New Zealand, included recommendations for military forts to be constructed at the country's four main ports at Auckland, Wellington, Lyttelton and Port Chalmers. These coastal artillery fortifications or land batteries were to be based on British designs. Heavy artillery pieces and ammunition was ordered from Britain. By 1885, work started in earnest on the construction of what eventually became seventeen forts, further encouraged by the March 1885 Panjdeh incident.

The Panjdeh incident saw a Russian force attack Afghanistan along the disputed Afghan border. The Afghan border had not been mapped with precision, as the Afghan Boundary Commission had yet to begin its work. British troops were present at the attack, as they had been advising the Afghans. The British regarded the incident as an incursion upon their sphere of influence, and prepared for open war with Russia. Hostilities were avoided only after much diplomatic wrangling. The practical effect on New Zealand was to once again, and more clearly than any incident since 1873, raise the specter of war.

The Panjdeh incident led to the climactic scare, and one which drove the country to action. Aside from propelling coastal defense and shipbuilding, a wave of panic swept the country—a minister in Bowen even formed a militia to fight against invaders.

The route to building of coastal fortifications was easy compared to the other looming issue: a New Zealand navy. Popular support for such a navy was strong, and went hand-in-hand with nascent New Zealand nationalism. But the issue risked tensions with Britain, and the government had shied away from suggesting a navy. Only with the Panjdeh incident did government support materialise. The issue was debated in March 1885, and premier Robert Stout entered negotiations with the British to procure a cruiser. Stout appeared willing to pay a high price for a cruiser, reflecting its perceived importance.

The end of the Russian Scare period reflected increased preparations and changing geopolitics. The installation of coastal defenses, and the procurement of a dedicated cruiser, helped put minds at ease. But more importantly, the foreign warships that were visiting Australasia were shifting to mostly German ones, as Germany rose to become the chief antagonist in British affairs.

New Zealand established a permanent military force with the Defence Act 1886.

== Fortifications of the Russian Scare ==
Fort	Location	Waypoint	Ordnance c. 1890	Range	Dates	Notes
North Head	Auckland	36°49′39″S 174°48′44″E	1 × BL 8 in (200 mm) gun RML 7 in guns 64 lb (29 kg) guns		1870	At Devonport, divided into three sub-forts: North Battery (to defend Rangitoto Channel); South Battery (with a 7 in (180 mm) gun to protect the inner harbour); Fort Cautley (with the 8 in (200 mm) gun on the summit).
Bastion Point	Auckland	36°50′43″S 174°49′29″E	2 × BL 6 in (150 mm) guns		1885–	In Mission Bay. Not completed.
Fort Resolution	Auckland	36.84966°S 174.79183°E	2 × BL 6 in (150 mm) guns		1885	In Parnell.
Fort Takapuna	Auckland	36°48′55″S 174°48′24″E	2 × BL 6 in (150 mm) guns		1886–	
Fort Victoria	Auckland	36.82661°S 174.79881°E	1 × BL 8 in (200 mm) gun		1885	On Mount Victoria, Devonport. The gun fired only once because of complaints from residents whose windows were broken.
Fort Ballance	Wellington	41°17′41″S 174°50′02″E	2 × 7" RML guns 1 × 6" BLHP gun 2 × QF 6 lb (2.7 kg) Nordenfelt guns		1885	(1885–1886) Point Gordon. At Miramar. Wellington's primary military fort until 1911 when Fort Dorset opened.
Fort Gordon	Wellington	41°17′41″S 174°50′02″E	1 × 8" BLHP gun		1895–1924	Point Gordon
Fort Buckley	Wellington	41°15′38″S 174°47′17″E	2 × 64 lb (29 kg) RML guns	3.2 km (2 mi)		At Kaiwharawhara.
Point Haswell Battery	Wellington	41.28506°S 174.826°E	1 × BL 8 in (200 mm) gun		1889	At Miramar.
Kau Point Battery	Wellington	41.28978°S 174.83177°E	1 × BL 8 in (200 mm) gun		1891–1922	At Miramar.
Fort Kelburne	Wellington	41.24623°S 174.81471°E	2 × BL 8 in (200 mm) guns		1885	At Ngauranga. Since been demolished due to construction of the Wellington Urban Motorway.
Battery Point	Lyttelton	43°36′10″S 172°44′25″E	2 × 7 in RML guns 1 × QF 6 2.7 kg (6 lb) Nordenfelt guns		1885	On the north side of Lyttelton Harbour, 4.8 km (3 mi) from mouth.
Fort Jervois	Lyttelton	43°37′11″S 172°45′15″E	2 × 8 in (200 mm) BL guns 2 × 6 in (150 mm) BL guns		1886	On Ripapa Island on the south side of Lyttelton Harbour. Fort Jervois is an internationally rare 1880s “Russian Invasion Scare” structure, which has retained a high level of authenticity of both structure and hardware (6” and 8” disappearing guns). It is one of only five examples of this type of fortification in the world. The Island has been managed by the Department of Conservation since 1990.
Spur Point Battery	Lyttelton	43.60435°S 172.73405°E	1 × 64 lb (29 kg) RML gun		1885	Site of battery, quarried away as part of land reclamation during the 1970s to build Cashin Quay.
Lawyers Head Battery	Dunedin	45°54′32″S 170°32′06″E			1885	Eastern Ocean Beach, Dunedin South.
Ocean Beach Battery	Otago Peninsula	45.90686°S 170.50702°E			1886	
St Clair Battery	Dunedin	45.9142°S 170.48752°E			1885	On a spur of Forbury Hill above Second Beach, Dunedin. No remnants remain; the area was cleared and subdivided for residential housing.
Fort Taiaroa	Otago Peninsula	45°46′26″S 170°43′40″E	1 × BL 6 in (150 mm) gun		1885	Otago Harbour. This Armstrong Disappearing Gun was installed in May 1889 and was recommissioned during World War II. It is the only one of its kind working and is still in its original gun pit.
