= Battery Point, Lyttelton =

Fortification in Lyttelton, New Zealand

- Lyttelton, New Zealand
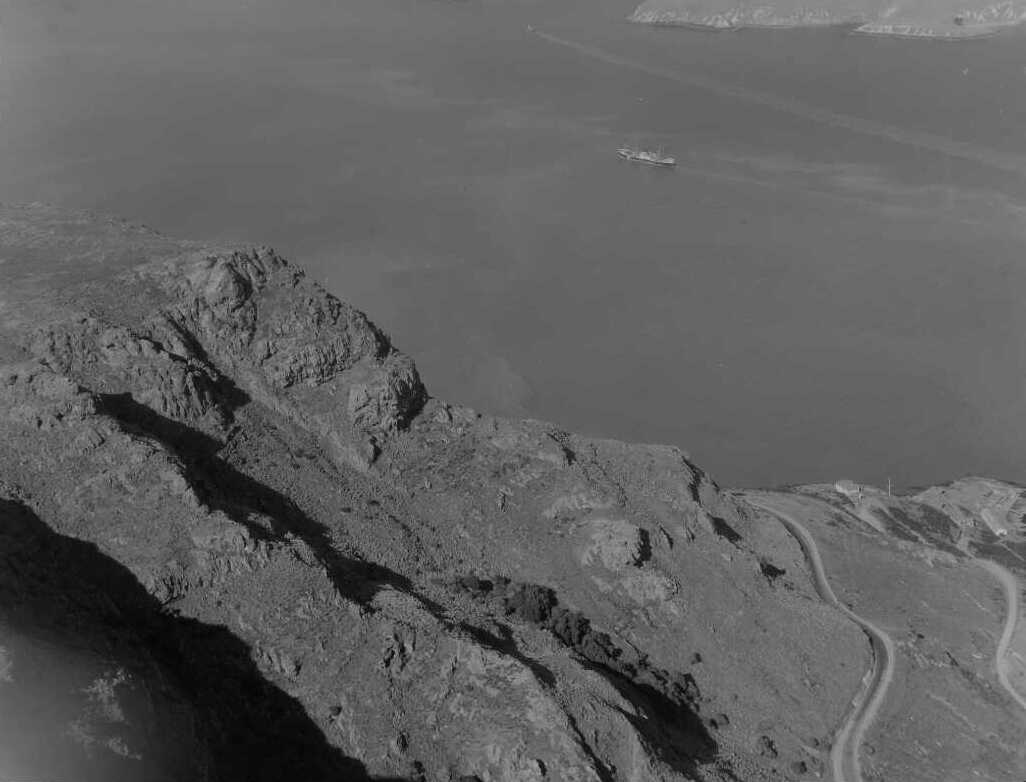
- Lyttelton Harbour with Battery Point visible at the extreme right of the foreground

Site information
- Type: Coastal defence fort
- Owner: Port of Lyttelton
- Open to the public: No

Location
- Coordinates: 43°36′10″S 172°44′25″E

Site history
- Built: 1885
- In use: 1885–1922; 1939–1957
- Materials: Earthworks, reinforced concrete and steel
- Battles/wars: Russian scares First World War; Second World War

Heritage New Zealand – Category 1
- Designated: 25 June 2004
- Reference no.: 7553

Battery Point was the site of a coastal defence fort in the Canterbury Region, New Zealand. Located to the east of the Port of Lyttelton, the fort was constructed in 1885 in response to one of the 'Russian scares'. It was also used in the First World War as well as the Second World War. In the postwar period, it was used as a training site up until 1957. On private land, the area was designated as Battery Point Battery Historic Area by Heritage New Zealand in 2004.

== History ==
Prior to the 1880s, there was little money available for the New Zealand government of the time to put towards coastal defences. However, in 1878 there was considerable tension between the empires of Britain and Russia and this led to the purchase of several heavy artillery guns. However, these were not mounted when they were delivered as the threat of war had receded by this time. There was a resurgence of the tensions, known as 'Russian scares', in the early- to mid-1880s which peaked in March 1885 with the Panjdeh incident raising strong fears of war between Britain and Russia. Public pressure led to the hasty construction of a number of forts, primarily around the key cities of Auckland and Wellington, but also in Lyttelton and Dunedin.

== Site ==
Battery Point was on the northern side of Lyttelton Harbour, positioned to the east of the port itself. The Governor of New Zealand, Lieutenant General Sir William Jervois, selected the site for placement of defences for the harbour. It was almost opposite Ripapa Island, located on the south side of the harbour and which was the site selected for what became known as Fort Jervois. The area on which Battery Point was sited had been in use since 1865; the Canterbury Artillery Volunteers performed gunnery practice there with its 12-pounder Armstrong gun battery, which led to the naming of the site.

== Construction and use ==
Fortifications were hastily erected in 1885, with two 7-inch Rifled Muzzle Loading (RML) guns positioned at Battery Point and manned by personnel of the Permanent Artillery, supported by the Lyttelton Artillery Volunteers. The first, designated the No. 1 RML gun, was put in relatively low down on the promontory, with the second, designated the No. 2 RML gun, placed further up the slope. Both were provided with magazines. The guns were test fired on 29 September. Three years later, more permanent structures were built at the site using convict labour. These included a rifle parapet in front of the No. 1 RML gun, to help protect against landings. There was also a bunker built for accommodation of 15 men by the gun. A more substantial barracks was built further up the hill and to the west. This work was completed by 1890.

Additional work was completed at the site in the early 1900s; a fire commander's station was added near the No. 2 RML gun in 1903, which was telephonically linked to Fort Jervois on the opposite shore, and a searchlight was placed by the lower gun. However, the engine that provided power for the searchlight was insufficient and it never performed as well as planned. A post for the commander of the facility was also built by the No. 2 RML gun. In 1910 the 7-inch RML guns were removed and sold into private hands. From 1911, Battery Point was garrisoned by No. 4 Company, New Zealand Garrison Artillery Territorials.

=== First World War ===
Fort Jervois served as the main coastal defence for Lyttelton Harbour during the First World War, with all the guns initially concentrated there. Up until 1918 Battery Point, still manned by volunteers of No. 4 Company, was only equipped with the searchlights. However, in the final year of the war, two 6-pounder guns were transferred from Fort Jervois to Battery Point. These were emplaced above and below the site of the original No. 1 RML gun although by this time this work was completed, the war was over. In the following few years, the searchlights were removed, along with the 6-pounder guns, and in 1922 Battery Point was leased out for grazing by livestock.

=== Second World War ===
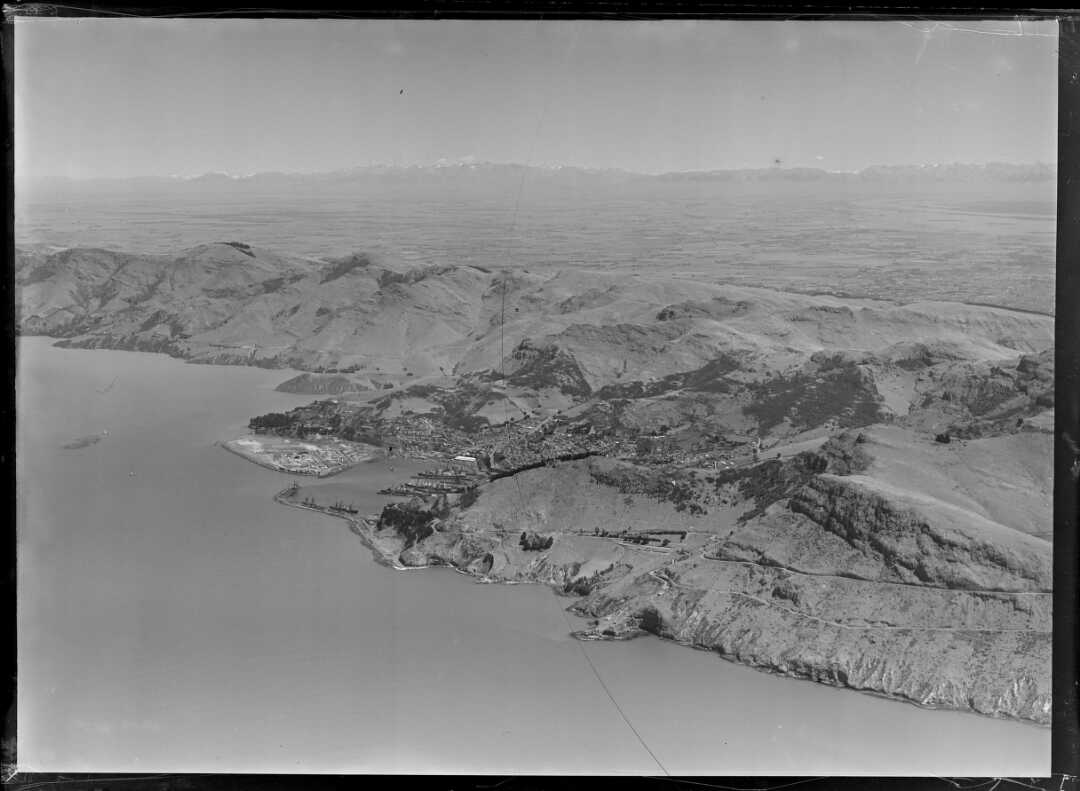
An aerial view of Lyttelton Harbour with Battery Point in centre right foreground

The threat of Japanese invasion prompted revitalisation of coastal defences in New Zealand and Lyttelton Harbour was deemed as one of the three most important harbours to be defended. As part of an upgrade that commenced in 1938, Battery Point had already been provided with two 4-inch Mk VII guns (installed in June 1939), plus a twin 6-pounder battery. A Depression Range Finder MK II was installed and weapon pits for Bren light machine guns were added. A building was erected over the site of the original No. 2 RML gun and five searchlights were installed to illuminate the inner harbour as required. The existing magazines were restored and an extra magazine installed, along with a war shelter and an engine room. In 1942, camouflage measures were put in place and protective armour added to the guns.

Battery Point served as part of Lyttelton's Examination battery; this allowed inspection of all ships entering the harbour. An incoming vessel would be directed to anchor at a designated point covered by the guns of Battery Point, where it would wait for inspection by an 'Examination vessel'. Warning shots would be fired if the vessel did not obey instructions. In this capacity, on 12 October 1939, the No. 1 gun at Battery Point fired an ill-directed warning shot on the Dolphin, a fishing boat, which killed one of its crew.

The site was initially manned by personnel of No. 23 Heavy Battery, New Zealand Artillery from May 1939 but over the war years, a number of units had responsibility for Battery Point. At its peak, in September 1941, there were 151 personnel which included several from the Women's Auxiliary Army Corps. By 1945, only 33 personnel were on site and on 19 June, Battery Point's active service ended. It was placed on a care and maintenance program.

=== Postwar ===
Battery Point returned to usage in the postwar period in 1948 as a training facility for coastal defence for Territorial Force personnel and conscripts serving their compulsory military training. Annual camps were held but over the following years the site began to deteriorate. The 4-inch guns were removed after the 1955 camp and replaced with more effective QF 3.7-inch Mk 3 mobile guns, loaned from No. 151 Anti-Aircraft Battery, and installed with their wheels removed. These were removed, along with the search lights in late 1957. Many of the buildings on site had already been relocated by this time.

== Current status ==
The land on which Battery Point is sited is owned by the Port of Lyttelton, and can be accessed from Lyttelton-Sumner Road. The area has been designated by Heritage New Zealand as the Battery Point Battery Historic Area and was listed as such on 25 June 2004. It was deemed to be of significance due to being the only surviving fortifications in the Canterbury Region that served as an anti-invasion defence in the Russian scares and the First and Second World Wars. Extant structures include gun and searchlight emplacements, battery observation posts, an engine room, magazine and shelter.

== See also ==
- Coastal fortifications of New Zealand
