= Coastal fortifications of New Zealand =

New Zealand coastal fortifications

The New Zealand coastline is 15,134 km long

Coastal fortifications were constructed in New Zealand in two main waves: around 1885 as a response to fears of an attack by Russia, and in World War II due to fears of invasion by the Japanese.

The fortifications were built from British designs adapted to New Zealand conditions. They typically included gun emplacements, pill boxes, fire control or observation posts, camouflage strategies, underground bunkers, sometimes with interconnected tunnels, containing magazines, supply and plotting rooms and protected engine rooms supplying power to the gun turrets and searchlights. There were also kitchens, barracks, and officer and NCO quarters.

== The "Russian Scare" forts of 1885 ==
In the 1870s New Zealand was a young self-governing colony of Britain. It had developed no coastal defences of any consequence and was becoming increasingly sensitive to how vulnerable its harbours were to attack by a hostile power or opportunistic raider. Fears of invasion by the expanding Russian Empire were common, especially due to the founding of Russia's Pacific port at Vladivostok.

Fears intensified after a hoax article was run in the Daily Southern Cross on 18 February 1873. The article proclaimed that war had been declared between England and Russia, and that a fictional Russian naval cruiser, the Kaskowiski, had attacked Auckland.

[The Kaskowiski] – whose very name should have made sober readers suspicious – had allegedly entered Auckland Harbour on the previous Saturday night and proceeded to capture a British ship, along with the city's arms and ammunition supply, and hold a number of leading citizens for ransom. The 954-man Russian vessel obviously meant business, with a dozen 30-ton guns as well as a remarkably new advance in warfare, a paralysing and deadly "water-gas" that could be injected into enemy ships from a great distance.

The Southern Cross article created panic and the Government commissioned its first reports on the colony's defences. It was now clearly understood that Britain would protect its territories and vital shipping routes, but the defence of individual ports was the responsibility of each self-governing colony. Then Russia declared war on Turkey in 1877 producing another "scare".

An 1884 report by Sir William Jervois, the Governor of New Zealand, included recommendations for military forts to be constructed at the country's four main ports at Auckland, Wellington, Lyttelton and Port Chalmers. These coastal artillery fortifications or land batteries were to be based on British designs. Heavy artillery pieces and ammunition was ordered from Britain. By 1885, work started in earnest on the construction of what eventually became seventeen forts, further encouraged by yet another Russian scare.

=== Artillery ===
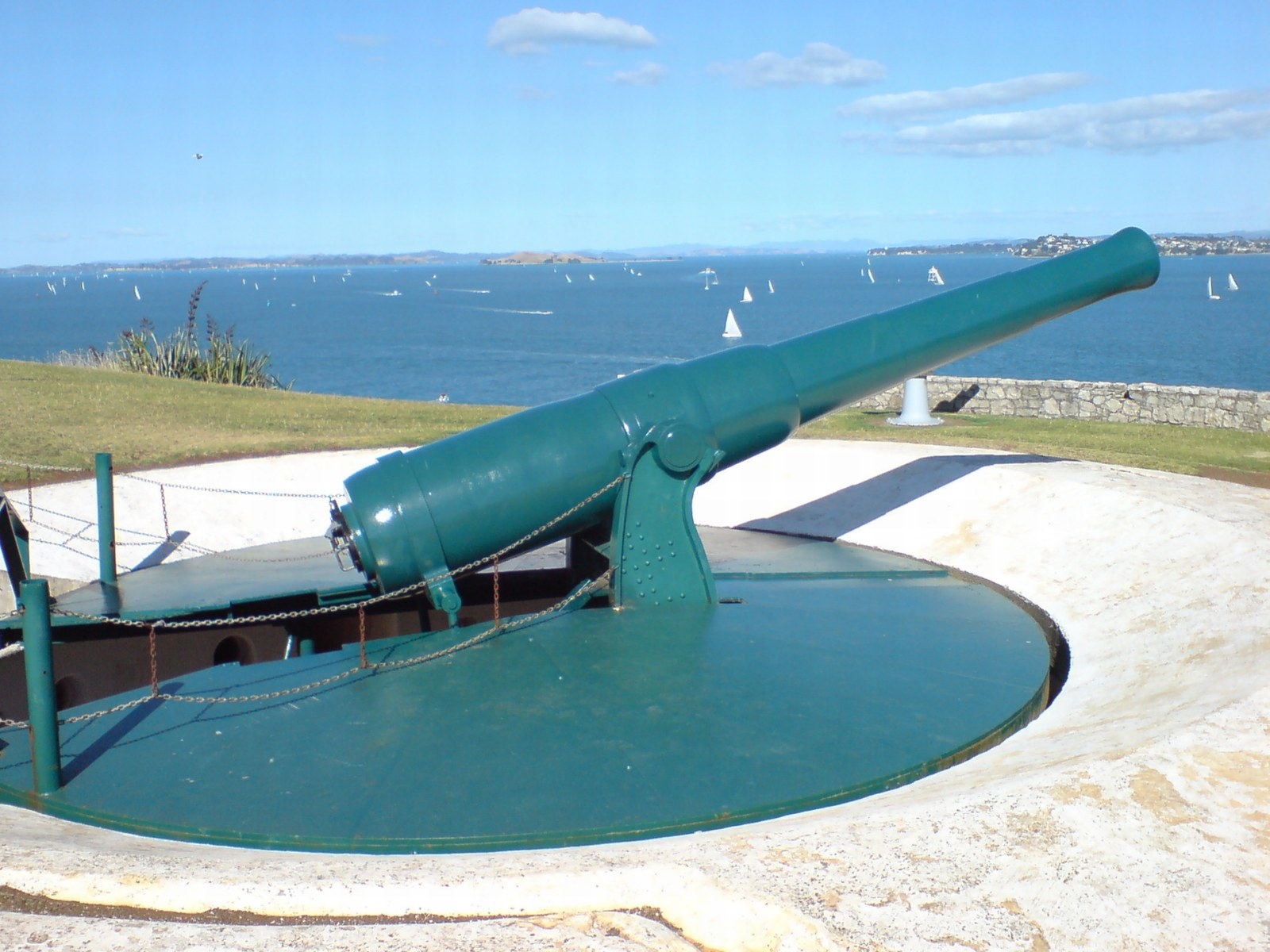
BL 8-inch Armstrong disappearing gun at North Head.

In 1885 the New Zealand Government bought ten Armstrong BL 8-inch and thirteen Armstrong BL 6-inch guns on disappearing carriages. The disappearing gun was the very latest in military technology in the 1880s. It was "disappearing" because as it fired, the recoil pushed the gun back underground where it could be reloaded under cover. The total costs of this artillery plus the costs of installation including land, emplacements, magazines and barracks was about £160,000.

Following the "second Russian scare" a number of additional RML 7 in (180 mm) and 64 lb (29 kg) guns were also installed

Artillery circa 1890	Number	Range	Notes
Armstrong BL 8 in (200 mm) Mk VII disappearing guns	10	6.4 km (4 mi)	Weighed 13.5 tons and fired a 82 kg (180 lb) shell.
Armstrong BL 6 in (150 mm) disappearing guns	13	4.8 km (3 mi)	Weighed 5 tons and fired a 45 kg (100 lb) shell.
RML 7 in (180 mm) 7 ton guns	11		Weighed 7 tons.
RML 64 lb (29 kg) Mk 3 guns	9	3.2 km (2 mi)	Weighed 64 cwt

=== The forts ===
Fort	Harbour	Way- point	Ordnance circa 1890	Range	Dates	Notes
North Head	Auckland	36°49′39″S 174°48′44″E	1 × BL 8 in (200 mm) gun RML 7 in guns 64 lb (29 kg) guns		1870	At Devonport, divided into three sub-forts: North Battery (to defend Rangitoto Channel); South Battery (with a 7 in (180 mm) gun to protect the inner harbour); Fort Cautley (with the 8 in (200 mm) gun on the summit).
Bastion Point	Auckland	36°50′43″S 174°49′29″E	2 × BL 6 in (150 mm) guns		1885–	In Mission Bay. Not completed.
Fort Resolution	Auckland	36.84966°S 174.79183°E	2 × BL 6 in (150 mm) guns		1885	In Parnell.
Fort Takapuna	Auckland	36°48′55″S 174°48′24″E	2 × BL 6 in (150 mm) guns		1886–	
Fort Victoria	Auckland	36.82661°S 174.79881°E	1 × BL 8 in (200 mm) gun		1885	On Mount Victoria, Devonport. The gun fired only once because of complaints from residents whose windows were broken.
Fort Ballance	Wellington	41°17′41″S 174°50′02″E	2 × 7" RML guns 1 × 6" BLHP gun 2 × QF 6 lb (2.7 kg) Nordenfelt guns		1885	(1885–1886) Point Gordon. At Miramar. Wellington's primary military fort until 1911 when Fort Dorset opened.
Fort Gordon	Wellington	41°17′41″S 174°50′02″E	1 × 8" BLHP gun		1895-1924	Point Gordon
Fort Buckley	Wellington	41°15′38″S 174°47′17″E	2 × 64 lb (29 kg) RML guns	3.2 km (2 mi)		At Kaiwharawhara.
Point Haswell Battery	Wellington	41.28506°S 174.826°E	1 × BL 8 in (200 mm) gun		1889	At Miramar.
Kau Point Battery	Wellington	41.28978°S 174.83177°E	1 × BL 8 in (200 mm) gun		1891-1922	At Miramar.
Fort Kelburne	Wellington	41.24623°S 174.81471°E	2 × BL 8 in (200 mm) guns		1885	At Ngauranga. Since been demolished due to construction of the Wellington Urban Motorway.
Battery Point	Lyttelton	43°36′10″S 172°44′25″E	2 × 7 in RML guns 1 × QF 6 2.7 kg (6 lb) Nordenfelt guns		1885	On the north side of Lyttelton Harbour, 4.8 km (3 mi) from mouth.
Fort Jervois	Lyttelton	43°37′11″S 172°45′15″E	2 × 8 in (200 mm) BL guns 2 × 6 in (150 mm) BL guns		1886	On Ripapa Island on the south side of Lyttelton Harbour. Fort Jervois is an internationally rare 1880s “Russian Invasion Scare” structure, which has retained a high level of authenticity of both structure and hardware (6” and 8” disappearing guns). It is one of only five examples of this type of fortification in the world. The Island has been managed by the Department of Conservation since 1990.
Spur Point Battery	Lyttelton	43.60435°S 172.73405°E	1 × 64 lb (29 kg) RML gun		1885	Site of battery, quarried away as part of land reclamation during the 1970s to build Cashin Quay.
Lawyers Head Battery	Port Chalmers	45°54′32″S 170°32′06″E			1885	Eastern Ocean Beach, Dunedin South.
Ocean Beach Battery	Port Chalmers	45.90686°S 170.50702°E			1886	
St Clair Battery	Port Chalmers	45.9142°S 170.48752°E			1885	On a spur of Forbury Hill above Second Beach, Dunedin. No remnants remain; the area was cleared and subdivided for residential housing.
Fort Taiaroa	Port Chalmers	45°46′26″S 170°43′40″E	1 × BL 6 in (150 mm) gun		1885	Otago Harbour. This Armstrong Disappearing Gun was installed in May 1889 and was recommissioned during World War II. It is the only one of its kind working and is still in its original gun pit.

== World War II coastal fortifications ==
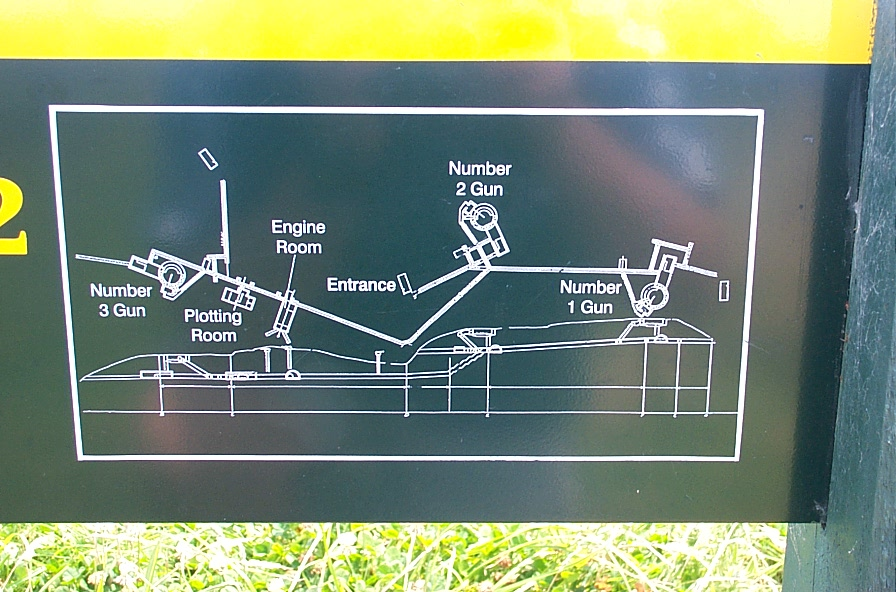
Tunnel layout for a three gun emplacement system.

The second main wave of building coastal fortifications occurred during World War II. This was mainly a response to a perceived threat of invasion by the Japanese after the attack on Pearl Harbor. From 1942 until 1944, when the threat receded, 42 coastal artillery fortifications or land batteries were either developed using historical fortifications or were built from scratch. The fortifications were built from British designs adapted to New Zealand conditions. Radar was installed which allowed long range shooting at night and replaced the traditional fortress system of range finding.

=== Ordnance ===
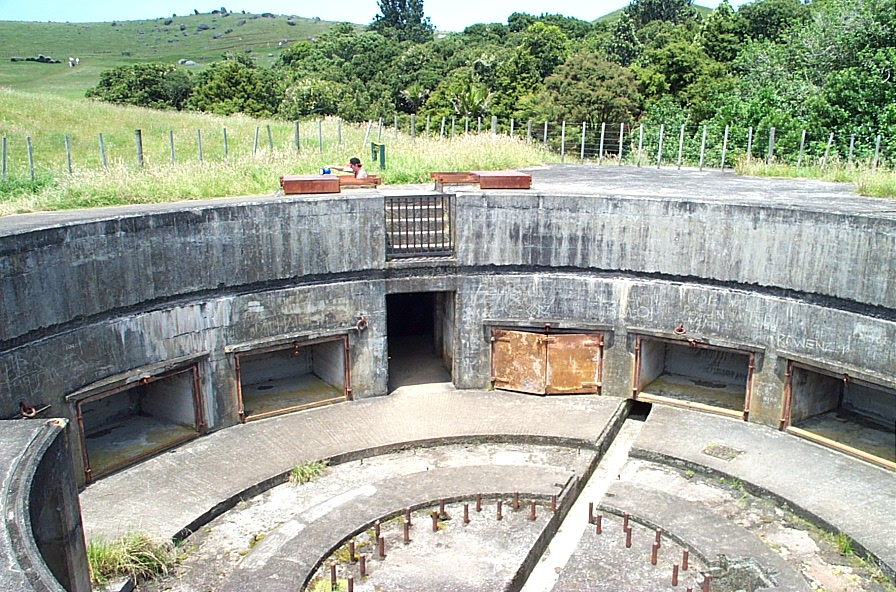
9.2-inch gun emplacement at Stony Batter.

The fortifications were equipped with both old and new ordnance, mostly British. Some World War I ordnance was requisitioned from museums and recommissioned.

Ordnance used during World War II	Number	Range	Notes
9.2-inch guns	6	29 km (18 mi)	
BL 6 inch Mk 24 guns	3	23 km (14 mi)	
BL 6 in (150 mm) Mk 21 guns	6	21 km (13 mi)	
6 in (150 mm) Mark 7 guns	32	19 km (12 mi)	
6 in (150 mm) EOC gun	2	9.7 km (6 mi)	Elswick Ordnance Company
5"/51 caliber guns (USA naval guns)	6	16 km (10 mi)	51 calibre MkVII 1912
4.7 in (120 mm) guns	1	9.7 km (6 mi)	
4 in (100 mm) Mark 7 guns	11	14 km (9 mi)	
155 mm guns	2	14 km (9 mi)	
75 mm guns	2		
QF 12 lb (5.4 kg) guns	8	13 km (8 mi)	
QF 6 lb (2.7 kg) guns	12	8.0 km (5 mi)	
Bofors 40 mm guns	48	6.4 km (4 mi)	
CASLs	48		Coastal Artillery Searchlight

=== The fortifications ===
The fortifications were administered by the Royal New Zealand Artillery, which grouped them into four areas. Each area was under the command of a heavy artillery regiment. Within each regiment the fortifications were grouped into batteries.

Also used (highlighted below in yellow) were seven of the now historic Russian scare fortifications

==== Upper North Island ====
Under the command of the 9th Heavy/Coast Regiment.

Battery	Name	Way- point	World War II Ordnance	Range	Dates	Notes
60	Motutapu Island	36°45′03″S 174°55′09″E	3 × 6 in (150 mm) Mk 21 guns 2 × CASLs	21 km (13 mi)	1936 -1945	Consisted of a battery, camp, gun emplacement, pill boxes and US naval magazines. Its remains are administered by DOC.
61; RHQ	North Head [Russian scare]	36°49′39″S 174°48′44″E	2 × 4 in (100 mm) Mk 7 guns 2 × 12 lb (5.4 kg) guns 4 × 6 lb (2.7 kg) H&N; 6 × CASLs	14 km (9 mi)	1870 -1957	Part of Auckland's coastal defence system from the Russian scare in 1885 to World War I. By World War II, with ships' guns able to fire long distances, the old fort was too close to the city it was meant to defend. New batteries were built at Motutapu, Castor Bay, Whangaparaoa and Waiheke Island and North Head became the centre of administration. A complex of tunnels, guns, searchlights and other fortifications remain and it is now a historic reserve managed by the Department of Conservation.
61	Bastion Point [Russian scare]	36°50′43″S 174°49′29″E	2 × 12 lb (5.4 kg) gun Twin 6 lb (2.7 kg) guns 3 × CASLs	13 km (8 mi)	1885–	Located in Mission Bay. The fortifications were buried in the 1940s when the Michael Joseph Savage memorial was built, and effectively forgotten. The underlying tunnels were later rediscovered.
61	Great Barrier Island	36.17605°S 175.35273°E	6 in (150 mm) Mk 7 gun 4 in (100 mm) Mk 7 gun 4 × 40 mm Bofors	19 km (12 mi)		Located between Fitzroy and Okiwi Bay
61	Manukau	37.05816°S 174.53774°E	1 × 4.7 in (120 mm) gun	9.7 km (6 mi)	1942	Built by American Forces [unknown unit] at the end of Harvey Road, Manukau Heads, approximately 100 m north of lighthouse site, this open fronted fortification had one gun, and an observation post inland. Accommodation was at the end of Harvey Road, with only concrete pads remaining for some buildings. Due to the erosive nature of these compacted sandhills the gun emplacement was undermined and slipped down the cliffs in the early 1980s. According to local residents, the gun was only fired 6 times, cracking the concrete abutments.
61	Motuihe Island	36°48′40″S 174°49′29″E	2 × 4 in (100 mm) Mk 7 guns	14 km (9 mi)	1872–	During World War II (1941) the Motuihe buildings became HMNZS Tamaki naval base, a training establishment. Now in the care of the Department of Conservation.
62	Fort Takapuna [Russian scare]	36°48′55″S 174°48′24″E	2 × 4 in (100 mm) Mk 7 guns 2 × CASLs	14 km (9 mi)	1886–	Also known as HMNZS Tamaki, and Narrow Neck. In 1963 the RNZN moved its New Entry Training School HMNZS Tamaki from Motuihe Island to the fort. The navy built a new Gunnery School and set up an Officer Training School. Previously officers had been sent overseas for training. Only the Officer and Trade Training schools remain. Has been under the care of the Department of Conservation since 2000.
63	Castor Bay	36°45′22″S 174°46′0″E	2 × 6 in (150 mm) Mk 7 guns 2 × CASLs	19 km (12 mi)	1942 -1944	Bunker at Castor Bay Notable for its camouflage strategies during World War II.
64	Whanga- paraoa	36°36′09″S 174°50′16″E	2 × 6 in (150 mm) Mk 7 guns 2 × CASLs	19 km (12 mi)		SE tip of peninsula
163	Whanga- paraoa	36°36′09″S 174°50′17″E	2 × 9.2 in (230 mm) guns	29 km (18 mi)		SE tip of peninsula
164	Stony Batter	36°45′45″S 175°10′27″E	2 × 9.2 in (230 mm) guns	29 km (18 mi)	1942–	Waiheke Island. Now in the care of the Department of Conservation.
68	Moturoa Island	35°13′07″S 174°11′21″E	4 × 6 in (150 mm) Mk 7 guns 8 × 40 mm Bofors	19 km (12 mi)		Bay of Islands
68	Whangaroa	35°00′40″S 173°45′21″E	6 in (150 mm) Mk 7 gun	19 km (12 mi)		South Head of harbour.
139	Bream Head	35°51′01″S 174°31′35″E	5 in (130 mm) Mk 7 gun (USA)	16 km (10 mi)	1942 -1944	Entrance to Whangarei harbour. Remaining structures are the (Colchester) gun shelter, engine room, and observation post. The most significant feature is the spotting mural with compass bearings painted above the slit window in the observation post.

==== Lower North Island ====
Under the command of the 10th Heavy/Coast Regiment.

Battery	Name	Way- point	World War II Ordnance	Range	Dates	Notes
70	Palmer Head	41°20′14″S 174°49′01″E	3 × 6 in (150 mm) Mk 21 guns 4 × CASLs	21 km (13 mi)	1936 -1957	At the entrance to the Wellington Harbour. The abandoned gun pits were blown up in the late 1960s. The only remains are the underground plotting rooms, which are closed for safety reasons.
71; RHQ	Fort Dorset	41°19′33″S 174°50′14″E	2 × 6 in (150 mm) Mk 7 guns 2 × 4 in (100 mm) Mk 7guns 4 × 12 lb (5.4 kg) guns 7 × CASLs	19 km (12 mi)	1908 -1991	At the inner entrance to Wellington harbour. The fort was demolished in 1998.
72	Fort Ballance [Russian scare]	41°17′41″S 174°50′02″E	2 × 4 in (100 mm) Mk 7guns Twin 6 lb (2.7 kg) guns 2 × 75 mm guns 6 × CASLs	14 km (9 mi)	1885– 1945	(1885–1886) Point Gordon By Mount Crawford, Karaka Bays, Wellington's primary fort until 1911 when Fort Dorset opened, Fort Ballance was closed in 1945 but remnants remain.
73	Fort Opau	41°13′20″S 174°41′46″E	2 × 6 in (150 mm) Mk 7 guns	19 km (12 mi)	1942 -1944	On a high headland above Mākara, on Wellington's west coast, protecting Cook Strait. The fort was built in 1941, and comprised two covered 6" gun emplacements, a battery operations post, and an observation post and a radar post, with a large barracks several hundred metres inland.
165	Wrights Hill Fortress	41°17′46″S 174°44′21″E	2 × 9.2 in (230 mm) guns	29 km (18 mi)	1942; 1957	This British-designed fortress was similar to the 9.2 inch fortresses built at Whangaparaoa and Stoney Batter. 2,030 feet (620 metres) of interconnecting tunnels were dug. Two 185 hp diesel generators provided power to manoeuvre the guns. Each gun weighed 135 tons and could fire a 380-pound (172 kg) shell across Cook Strait or up to Plimmerton. The fortress was used for training purposes up to the mid-1950s. In early 1960 the guns were sold for scrap, ironically, to the Japanese. The Wrights Hill Fortress Restoration Society is restoring the coastal battery to its former state.
77	Bluff Hill	39°28′43″S 176°55′03″E	2 × 6 in (150 mm) Mk 7 guns 4 × 40 mm Bofors	19 km (12 mi)		At Napier. Also a signal station during World War II, although never a lighthouse, despite being situated on Lighthouse Road.
77	Titirangi (Kaiti Hill)	38°42′03″S 178°03′56″E	5 in (130 mm) Mk 7 gun (USA)	16 km (10 mi)		Located at Gisborne.
78	Moturoa	39.06372°N 174.02887°E	2 × 155 mm guns 4 × 40 mm Bofors	14 km (9 mi)		At New Plymouth.
140	Languard Bluff	39°57′30″S 175°01′20″E	5 in (130 mm) Mk 7 gun (USA)	16 km (10 mi)		At Wanganui.

==== Upper South Island ====
Under the command of the 11th Heavy/Coast Regiment.

Battery	Name	Way- point	World War II Ordnance	Range	Dates	Notes
80; RHQ	Godley Head	43°35′13″S 172°48′21″E	3 × 6 in (150 mm) Mk 24 guns 2 × CASLs	23 km (14 mi)	1939 -1963	At the northern entrance to Lyttelton Harbour, the last NZA to be decommissioned. It last fired a gun in 1959. In its heyday in World War II, it was staffed by over 400 men and women and was a self-contained community. It is ranked in the top ten New Zealand coastal defence heritage sites. It is now under the care of the Department of Conservation and the Godley Head Heritage Trust.
81	Battery Point [Russian scare]	43°36′10″S 172°44′25″E	2 × 4 in (100 mm) Mk 7guns Twin 2.7 kg (6 lb) guns 5 × CASLs	14 km (9 mi)	1886–	On the northern side of Lyttelton Harbour, 4.8 km (3 mi) from mouth.
81	Fort Jervois [Russian scare]	43°37′11″S 172°45′15″E	6 in (150 mm) EOC gun	9.7 km (6 mi)	1886	On Ripapa Island on the southern side of Lyttelton Harbour. It is an internationally rare 1880s “Russian Invasion Scare” military defence structure, which has retained a high level of authenticity of both structure and hardware (6” and 8” disappearing guns). It is one of only five examples of this type of fortification in the world. The island has been managed by the Department of Conservation since 1990.
	Magazine Bay [Russian scare]	43.61081°S 172.70488°E	?		1886	Lyttelton, in conjunction with nearby torpedo boat base.
84	Whekenui Battery	41.20589°S 174.30439°E	6 in (150 mm) Mk 7 gun 12 × 40 mm Bofors	19 km (12 mi)		Queen Charlotte Sound
84	Maraetai	41°15′21″S 174°08′01″E	6 in (150 mm) Mk 7 gun	19 km (12 mi)		In Tory Channel, Queen Charlotte Sound.
84	Blumine Island	41°09′30″S 174°14′11″E; 41°09′31″S 174°14′39″E	2 × 6 in Mk 7 guns	19 km (12 mi)	1942 -1945	Guarding the northern entrance to Queen Charlotte Sound, the guns are positioned separately on the two northern points of Blumine Island. Associated with each emplacement are a magazine, observation post and accommodation camp.
84	Post Office Point	40.97112°S 173.99369°E	6 in (150 mm) Mk 7 gun	19 km (12 mi)		In Pelorus Sound / Te Hoiere.
84	Maud Island	41°01′01″S 173°54′21″E	6 in (150 mm) Mk 7 gun	19 km (12 mi)		At the entrance to Pelorus Sound / Te Hoiere. Under the care of the Department of Conservation.
84	Port Hills	41°16′10″S 173°15′59″E	6 in (150 mm) Mk 7 gun	19 km (12 mi)		In Nelson.
85	Smithfield Freezing Works	44°22′16″S 171°14′41″E	2 × 6 in (150 mm) Mk 7 guns 4 × 40 mm Bofors	19 km (12 mi)	1942– 1944	In Timaru. The No 2 (Colchester type) gun shelter is in an excellent state of preservation.
134	Westport	41°43′48″S 171°35′15″E	5 in (130 mm)Mk 7 gun (USA); 4 × 40 mm Bofors	16 km (10 mi)	1942– 1944	On South Spit. The gun emplacement is no longer there but the battery observation post is visible on Google Earth.
134	Cobden	42°26′15″S 171°12′45″E	5 in (130 mm) Mk 7 gun (USA); 4 × 40 mm Bofors	16 km (10 mi)	1942– 1944	At Greymouth. Establishment: 2 Officers, 1 WO, 3 Sergeants and 26 ORs. Grey District Council destroyed part of this site, without consultation, in 2007 to make way for a sewer line.
143	Wainui	43°49′46″S 172°54′17″E	2 × 6 in (150 mm) Mk 7 guns 4 × 40 mm Bofors; 2 × CASLs	19 km (12 mi)	1942– 1944	In Akaroa Harbour on Banks Peninsula

==== Lower South Island ====
Under the command of the 13th Coast Regiment.

Battery	Name	Way- point	World War II Ordnance	Range	Dates	Notes
RHQ	Dunedin					
82	Fort Taiaroa [Russian scare]	45°47′12″S 170°43′39″E	6 in (150 mm) EOC gun 5 × CASLs	9.7 km (6 mi)		Armstrong disappearing gun at Taiaroa Head Close to Taiaroa Head at the northeastern tip of Otago Peninsula. Restored, and open to the public. Includes what is believed to be the only 1889 Armstrong Disappearing gun remaining in working condition in its original gun pit.
82	Rerewahine	45°47′13″S 170°44′45″E	2 × 6 in (150 mm) Mk 7 guns	19 km (12 mi)		Otago Peninsula.
82	Tomahawk	45°54′19″S 170°33′11″E	2 × 6 in (150 mm) Mk 7 guns	19 km (12 mi)		Dunedin
82	Harington Point	45.7834°S 170.7245°E	2 × twin 6 lb (2.7 kg) guns 2 × 6 lb (2.7 kg) H&N			Dunedin
141	Cape Wanbrow	45°07′13″S 170°58′50″E	5 in (130 mm) Mk 7 gun (USA)	16 km (10 mi)	1942–	Under the care of the Oamaru Coastal Defence Restoration Group
142	Bluff	46.61215°S 168.35365°E	6 in (150 mm) Mk 7 gun	19 km (12 mi)		

== Post war ==
The advent of air warfare and missiles made these forts redundant and most were decommissioned by the 1950s. Godley Head continued because of compulsory military training and last fired a gun in 1959. The Department of Conservation has the remains of around 30 installations on land it manages.

== Postscript ==
None of the forts fired a gun in anger, though in October 1939 a Battery Point gun at Lyttelton accidentally sank the fishing boat "Dolphin" and killed its skipper.

In 1972 the United States declassified a contingency plan for invading New Zealand. This plan consisted of a 120-page intelligence document called Naval War Plan for the Attack of Auckland, New Zealand. The intelligence for the report was gathered during the visit of the Great White Fleet to Auckland over six days in 1908. The plan advocated Manukau Harbour as the best invasion point and landing heavy guns on Rangitoto Island to shell the forts on the North Shore. The plan was not very realistic and may have been an exercise to keep young officers busy (see United States war plans; which allocated the colour Garnet to New Zealand as part of War Plan Red).

== See also ==
- Early naval vessels of New Zealand
- Coastal defences of Australia during World War II
- Coastal Forces of the Royal New Zealand Navy
- Axis naval activity in New Zealand waters
- British hardened field defences of World War II
- British anti-invasion preparations of World War II
- Seacoast Defense (US)

== Bibliography ==
- Cooke, Peter (2002). Defending New Zealand: Ramparts on the Sea 1840s–1950s. Wellington: Defence of New Zealand Study Group. ISBN 0-473-08923-8. Two volumes. Reviewed by Capital Defence.
- Corbett, Peter D. (2003). A First Class Defended Port: The History of the Coast Defences of Auckland, its Harbour and Approaches. ISBN 0-478-22452-4 (Available from Auckland Conservancy, Department of Conservation).
- Glackin, Russell (2009) In defence of our land: a tour of New Zealand's historic harbour forts, Penguin, ISBN 0-14-301186-3.
