= Fort Resolution, Auckland =

Fortification in Auckland, New Zealand

Fort Resolution
- Point Resolution, Parnell, Auckland, New Zealand
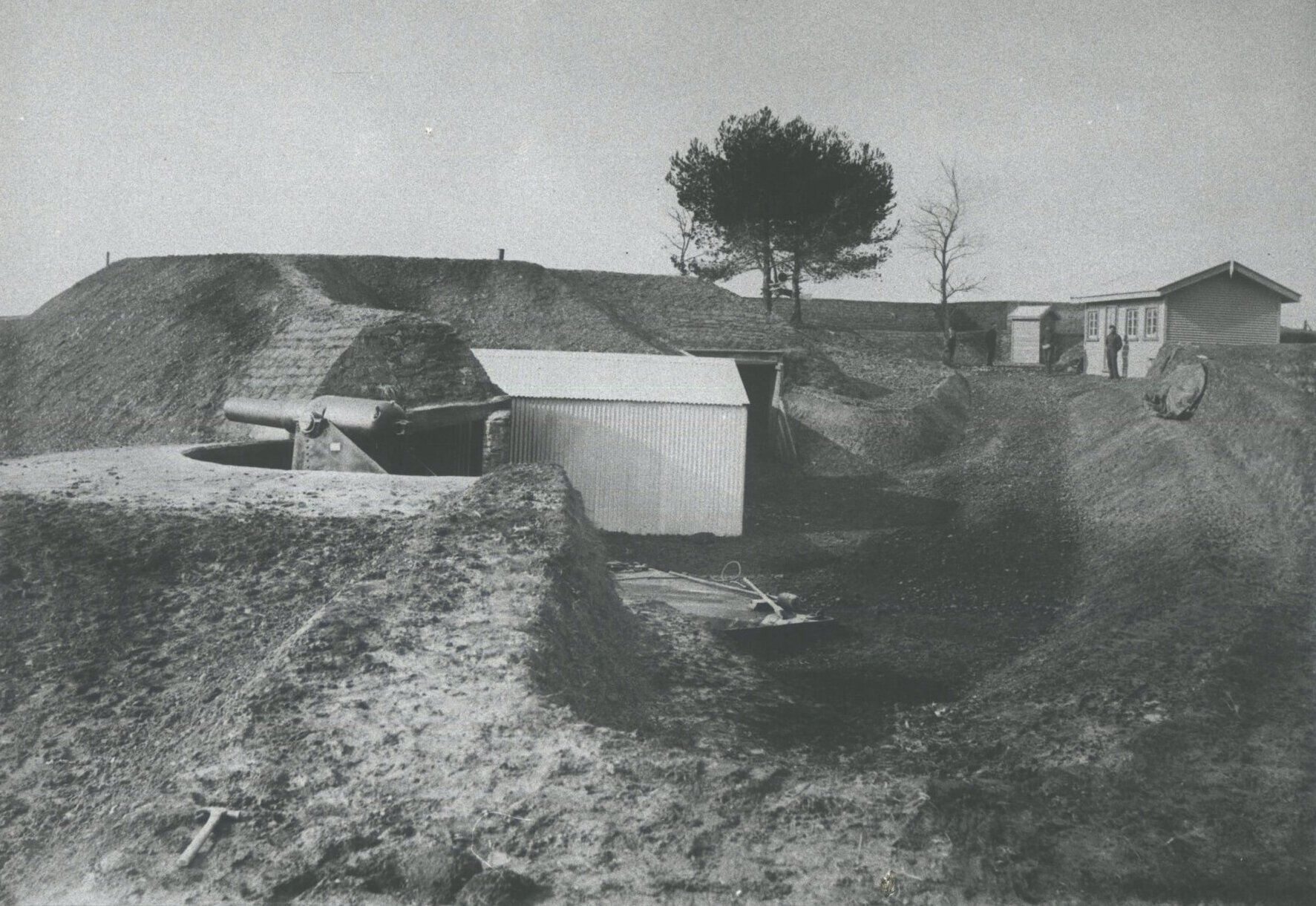
- Fort Resolution in 1886

Site information
- Type: Coastal defence fort
- Owner: Public reserve
- Open to the public: Yes

Location
- Coordinates: 36°51′03″S 174°47′30″E

Site history
- Built: 1885
- In use: 1885–1904
- Materials: Earthworks, brick and concrete
- Demolished: 1914
- Battles/wars: Russian scares

Fort Resolution was a coastal defence fort erected at Point Resolution in Auckland, New Zealand. Located in the suburb of Parnell, it was constructed in 1885 in response to one of the 'Russian scares'. The fort was abandoned in 1904 and the site substantially cleared in 1914. It is now the site of Point Resolution Park.

== History ==
Prior to the 1880s, there was little money available for the New Zealand government of the time to put towards coastal defences. However, in 1878 there was considerable tension between the empires of Britain and Russia and this led to the purchase of several heavy artillery guns. However, these were not mounted when they were delivered as the threat of war had receded by this time. There was a resurgence of the tensions, known as 'Russian scares', in the early- to mid-1880s which peaked in March 1885 with the Panjdeh incident raising strong fears of war between Britain and Russia. Public pressure led to the hasty construction of a number of forts, primarily around the key cities of Auckland and Wellington.

== Site ==
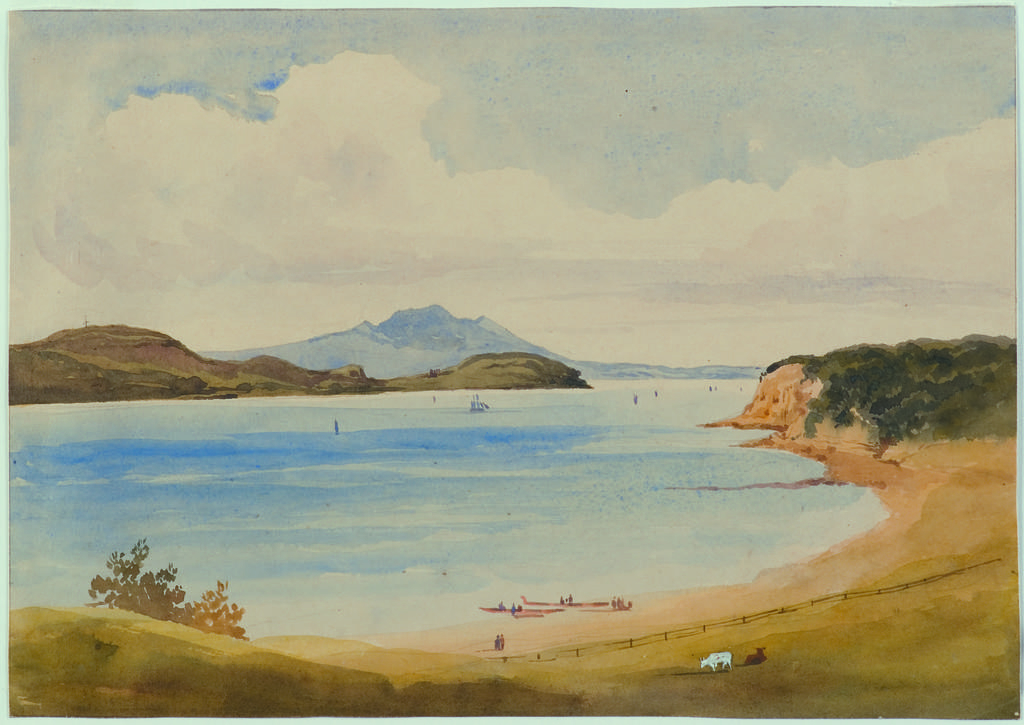
1856 sketch of Judges Bay and Point Resolution (right), prior to the construction of Fort Resolution

Point Resolution in Parnell, Auckland, is a promontory on the southern shores of the Waitematā Harbour that separates the adjacent Hobson and Judges Bays. A pā (hillfort) had existed in the area in the eighteen century, originally populated by the Te Waiohua iwi (tribe) and then by Ngāti Whātua iwi when it seized the area. In 1850, the site was part of a parcel of land given to the Church of England's St Stephen's Native School Trust for the purpose of establishing a native school. However, it was largely vacant at the time of the Panjdeh incident with only a few dwellings established in the area on land that the Church leased to residents.

== Construction and use ==
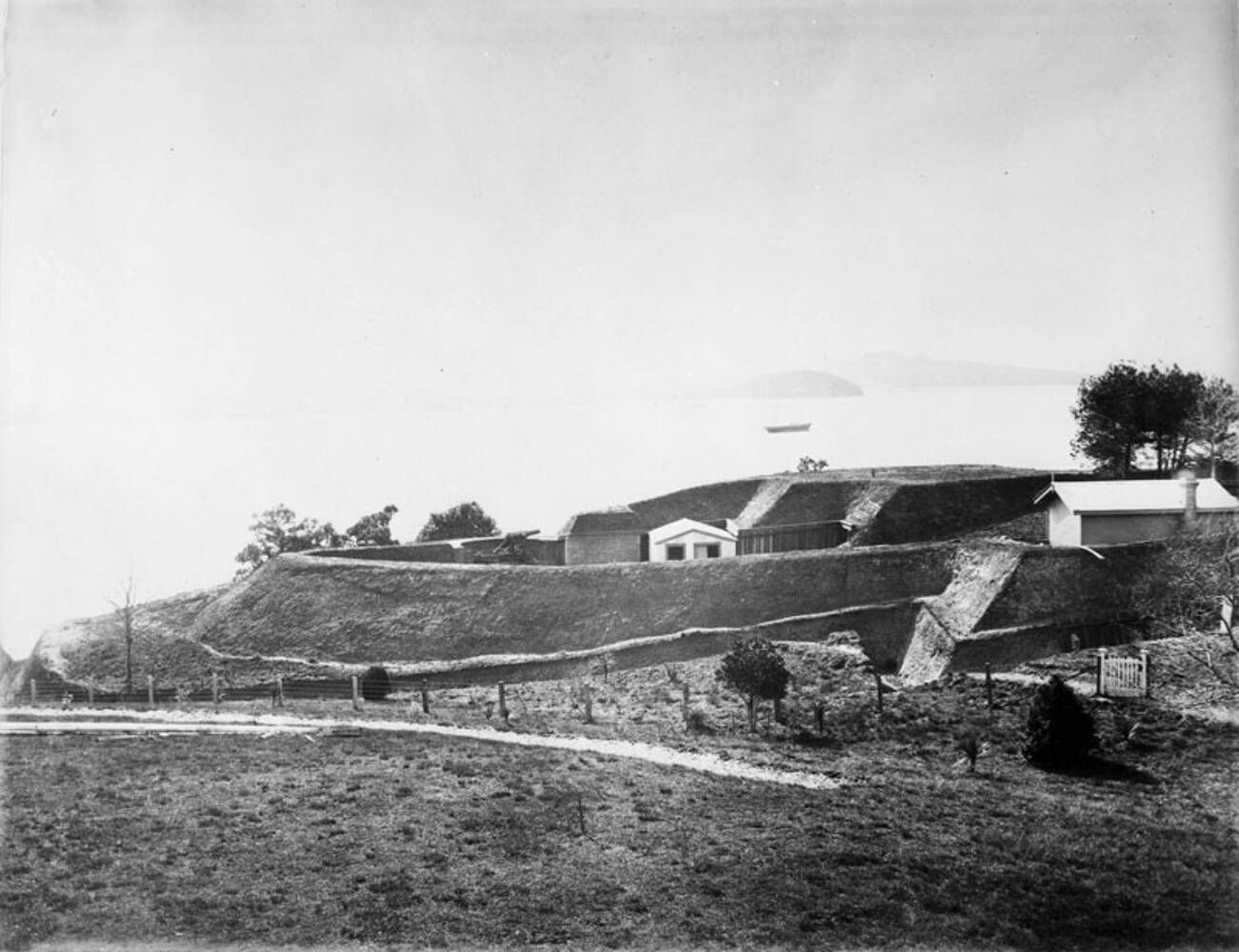
Fort Resolution in the 1880s

The site at Point Resolution was identified as being strategically important since it covered the entrance to the inner portion of Waitematā Harbour. To allow the construction of the fort, to be named Fort Resolution, the land was purchased from the Church.

Fort Resolution was quickly and crudely erected by personnel of the Armed Constabulary beginning in March 1885. Two 64-pounder Rifled Muzzle Loading (RML) guns were installed, facing north, on rotating carriages on the west and eastern sides of a central brick magazine with covered passages to the gun emplacements. A ditch circumscribing the site was prepared and an earthwork parapet was thrown up. A hut for use by a caretaker was also built. The facilities were manned by personnel of the Volunteer Force. At the same time, other forts were built on the Waitematā Harbour shoreline; one at Bastion Point, to the east, and the other at North Head on the opposite side of the harbour.

Given the hasty nature of its construction, Fort Resolution underwent amendments in 1891 to improve its structure. Concrete revetments were added and the magazine enlarged. An observation post was added to the top of the magazine, which was covered by an earthen mound. Some other forts that were updated received additional guns, but Fort Resolution was not one of these, with artillery batteries being concentrated on North Head.

Fort Resolution was only ever used for practice and by 1904 the 'Russian scares' were on the wane. That year Fort Resolution was abandoned and its RML guns were removed to North Head. Ten years later, the site was substantially cleared during the construction of the adjacent Parnell Baths. The site is now Point Resolution Park, which is administered by the Auckland City Council.

Parts of the site were excavated in 1991 and evidence of some of the concrete and brickwork forming a portion of the magazine of Fort Resolution was found. As of 2015, a portion of one of the gun emplacements remain visible.

== See also ==
- Coastal fortifications of New Zealand
