= Fort Kelburne =

Former coastal artillery battery in Wellington, New Zealand

Coordinates: 41.24623°S 174.81471°E

- Location: Ngauranga, Wellington, New Zealand
- Built: 1885–1887
- Built for: New Zealand Army
- Demolished: 1963

Fort Kelburne was a coastal artillery battery located in Wellington, New Zealand. Built between 1885 and 1887 in the vicinity of Ngauranga, following fears of an impending war with Russia, the fort was used for training purposes, later receiving renovations during the First World War. Fort Kelburne, along with Fort Buckley in Kaiwharawhara, were the first coastal defences to be built in a ring that was designed to protect Wellington Harbour.

Following the end of the war, the fort ceased to be occupied by the New Zealand Army, with ownership transferring to the Public Works Department. In the course of its existence, no shots were ever fired in anger. In 1963, the fort was completely demolished by the Public Works Department to make way for two large connecting roads between the Wellington Urban Motorway and Ngauranga Gorge. As a result, little remains of the former installation.

== History ==
=== Construction ===
Fort Kelburne was the first of four coastal fortifications built in Auckland, Wellington, Lyttelton and Dunedin in the development of New Zealand's coastal defences during the Russian scare. Construction began in December 1885 and was completed in April 1887. The naming of the fort varies in difference references between Kelburn and Kelburne, but is likely named after Viscount Kelburne, the eldest son of Lord Glasgow, who was the governor-general of New Zealand from 1892 to 1897.

=== Specifications ===
The fort was built on a series of tiered levels following the topography of the hill, with its main guns mounted 37 metres (120 ft) apart. A brick and concrete palisade along with a spiked steel fence was built around the gun pits to repel land-based attackers. The guns were linked underground by a bomb-proof passage. All underground galleries and gun pits were built using the cut-and-cover method.

== Fortifications and Armaments ==
- 1887–1925:
  - 2x 6-inch disappearing gun
  - 1x 13 or 15-pounder Nordenfelt gun

== Remains and artefacts ==
Little to no remains of the fort can be seen today, due to the construction of the Wellington Urban Motorway. The access road up the hill from Ngauranga remains, while one 6-inch Armstrong hydro-pneumatic gun remains as a monument at Trentham Military Camp. Other remains are located at the National Army Museum in Waiouru.

However, during demolition by the Public Works Department, the fort was well documented with photographs and diagrams made. Copies of these can be found at both Archives New Zealand, as well as the National Library of New Zealand.

== See also ==
- Coastal fortifications of New Zealand
- List of New Zealand military bases
