= Kau Point Battery =

Defence battery in Wellington, New Zealand

Coordinates: 41.289°S 174.831°E

Kau Point Battery is a 19th-century coast defence battery constructed in Wellington, New Zealand in the 1890s. It is located on the east side of Point Halswell in Wellington, New Zealand, approximately midway between the Massey Memorial and Fort Ballance, close to the site of the ancient Māori settlement of Kau-whakaara-waru.

Construction of the battery was completed in 1891, with the intention of commanding the inner harbour in conjunction with the Halswell Battery, Fort Kelburne and Fort Ballance. The Battery was a single circular gun-pit with an underground magazine on the same level buried behind it. Armament consisted of one One eight-inch disappearing gun. Secondary armament was planned, but never installed consisting of either twoQ.F. Nordenfeldt six-pounder guns or a single QF 6-pounder Hotchkiss. Fire control was provided by a Battery Command Post(BCP), equipped with a MK1b Direction Range Finder was located on the hill behind it.

The battery was manned until 1925, and then converted into a magazine and abandoned in the 1950s when New Zealand abandoned its coast defences.

== See also ==
- Coastal fortifications of New Zealand
