= Fort Ballance =

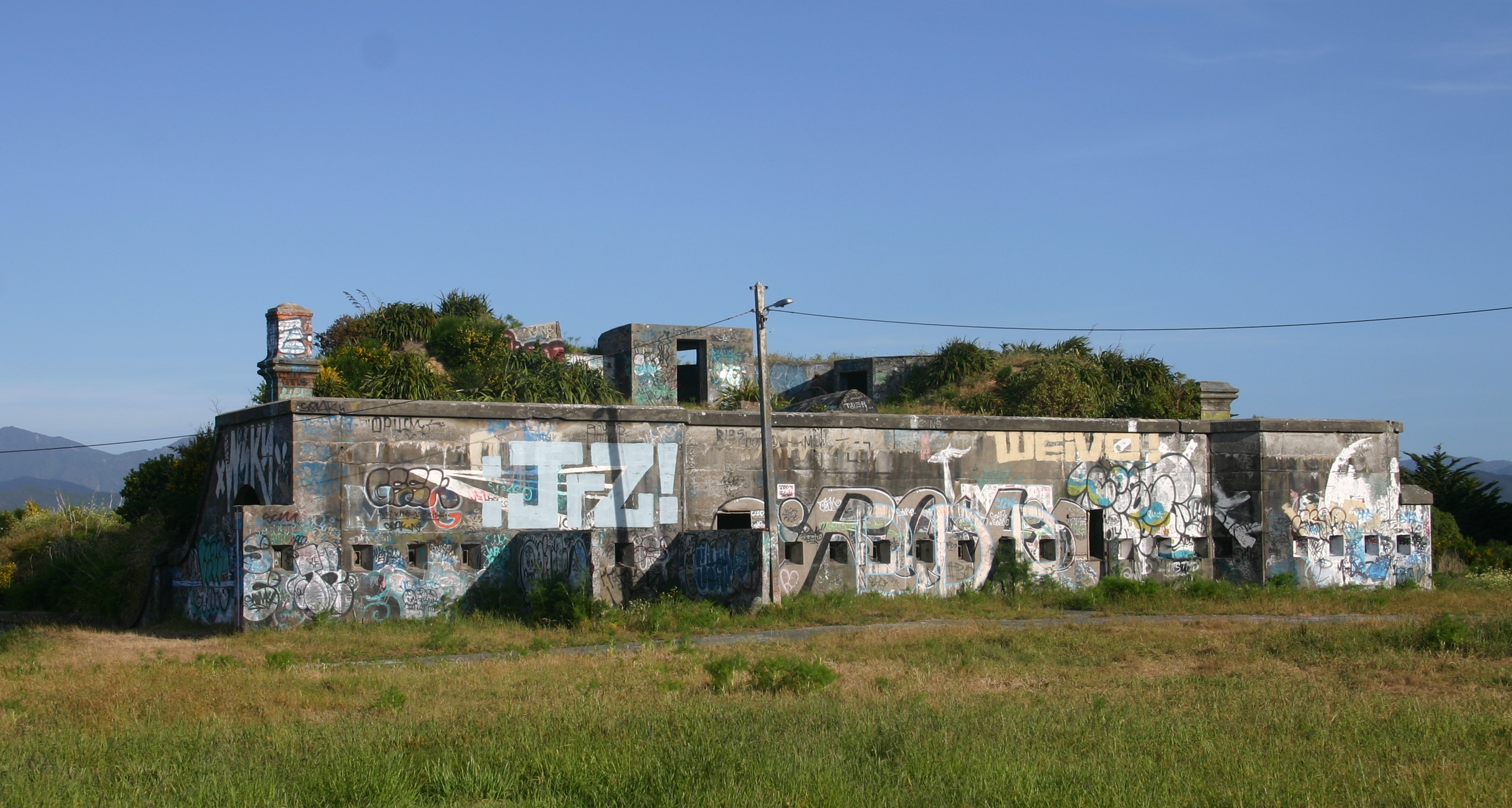
- Interactive map of Fort Ballance
- Location: Point Gordon, Wellington
- Coordinates: 41°17′40.65″S 174°50′3.95″E
- Built: 1885

Heritage New Zealand – Category 1
- Designated: 19 July 1990
- Reference no.: 5074

Fort Ballance is a former coastal artillery battery on Point Gordon on Wellington's Miramar Peninsula.

Built in 1885 following fears of an impending war with Russia, Fort Ballance is one of the best preserved of a string of nineteenth century coastal fortifications constructed to protect New Zealand from naval attack. In 1885, the Government, reluctantly acknowledging that they could not rely solely on Britain for protection, commissioned engineer Major Henry Cautley to design a series of fortifications to protect the country's main ports. The fortress is listed as a Category 1 Historic Place by Heritage New Zealand. Fort Ballance was the premier fort in the Wellington area for 26 years (1885-1911). Used by the military over a period of 60 years (1885-1945), the 1880s layout of Fort Ballance is largely unaltered and a good impression of the original nineteenth century fort remains. The fort is a permanent reminder of the technology used in the coastal defence network of the 1880s and it is an early example of the use of concrete as a building material.

== Overview ==
Fort Ballance is the largest of the military installations located on the spur between Mahanga Bay and Scorching Bay. The other positions were known variously as Fort Gordon, the Spur Battery and the Low or Foreshore Battery. The ruins of these forts and batteries were partly buried about 1960.

The fort follows the topography of the spur and earthworks were used to build up the centre of the position where the command post and communications centre were located. Earthworks also provided protection for the barracks, ablution areas, magazines and stores to the rear of the gun pits.

The rear of the fort adjoining the accommodation casemates was enclosed by musketry parapets and loopholed walls, parts of which have been demolished.

Fort Ballance had positions for five main gun pits facing the channel. The concrete gun pits, some of which were closed and others open, are circular or semi-circular and while the guns have been removed the gun emplacements remain intact.

Fort Gordon, to the south of Fort Ballance, consisted of one gun-pit and magazines. It is now almost completely buried as are the smaller positions lower down the spur. Tunnel entrances have been filled in.

Additional firing support was located at Kau Point and Point Halswell, and the positions were protected from land attack by a further defence position on Mount Crawford.

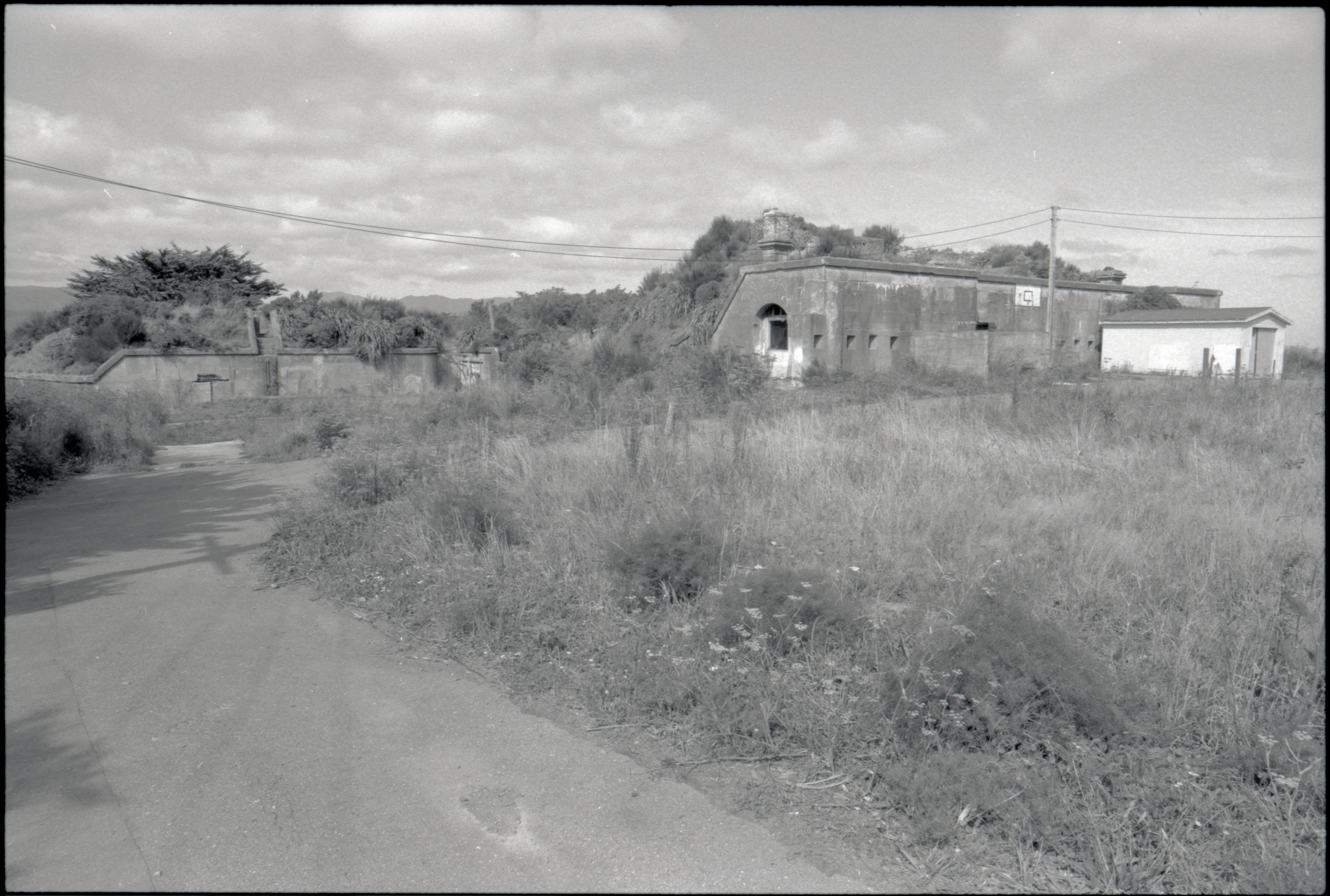
Fort Ballance, 1992

== Armaments ==
=== Fort Ballance ===
The main armament at Fort Ballance evolved over the years to include:

- 1885-1910:
  - Two Two Seven-inch R.M.L. guns
- 1886-1924
  - One One six-inch disappearing gun
- 1903-1924
  - One One six-inch disappearing gun, replaced one of the 7inch RML
- 1892-WW1
  - Two Q.F. Nordenfeldt six-pounder guns were mounted at the flank angles.

=== Fort Gordon ===
The main armament at Fort Gordon consisted of:

- 1895-1924
  - One One eight-inch disappearing gun
  - One QF 3-pounder Hotchkiss gun (Spur Battery)

=== Foreshore Batteries ===
The main armament of the Low Battery consisted of:

- 1891-1897
  - Two 64-Pounder RML
- 1897-1907
  - Two QF 6-pounder Hotchkiss, removed after WW1.

=== Gordon Point Battery ===
- 1901-1923
  - Two QF 12 pounders
- 1941-1959
  - Two BL 4 inch naval gun Mk VII guns
- 1942
  - Two Ordnance QF 18-pounder guns
- 1943-1944
  - Two 75 mm Gun M1917 guns
- 1944-1945
  - One twin QF 6 pounder 10 cwt gun

== Ammunition Depot ==
With the decommissioning of the guns of Fort Ballance in the immediate post-war years, Fort Ballance along with the Mahanga Bay facilities, Shelly Bay, Fort Gordon and the Kau Point Battery were taken over by the Ammunition Section of the New Zealand Army Ordnance Corps as the first large scale ammunition depot of the NZAOC until 1929 when purpose-built facilities were constructed at Hopuhopu Camp in the Waikato. The ammunition infrastructure at Fort Ballance and the surrounding area consisted of 19 magazines, one store and a laboratory remained in use until the early years of the Second World War.

== Seesaw Searchlight ==
Below and to the east of the fort was a "seesaw' searchlight, set up in 1891 and powered by the steam engine in Fort Ballance. The searchlight consisted of an electric carbon lamp, capable of a strong beam for target illumination. The bulb was vulnerable to enemy fire so it was protected in a recessed emplacement while a large mirror attached to the end of the ‘see-saw’ girder reflected the light beam across the water.

The searchlight was able to illuminate targets from the harbour Heads to Ward Island with a power of 50000 candlepower.

Only a few of these were built anywhere in the Empire. It was difficult to operate and was never successful and the position was abandoned in 1899, but the emplacement remains today.

== Fatal accidents ==
- 7 August 1899 whilst attempting to demolish the Seesaw emplacement three members of the permanent militia were killed and one injured in a gun cotton explosion.
- 2 November 1904 whilst conducting live firing on a 12 pounder, there was a breech explosion in which one gunner was killed and five injured.

== See also ==
- Coastal fortifications of New Zealand
