= Fort Takapuna =

Category 1 historic place in Auckland

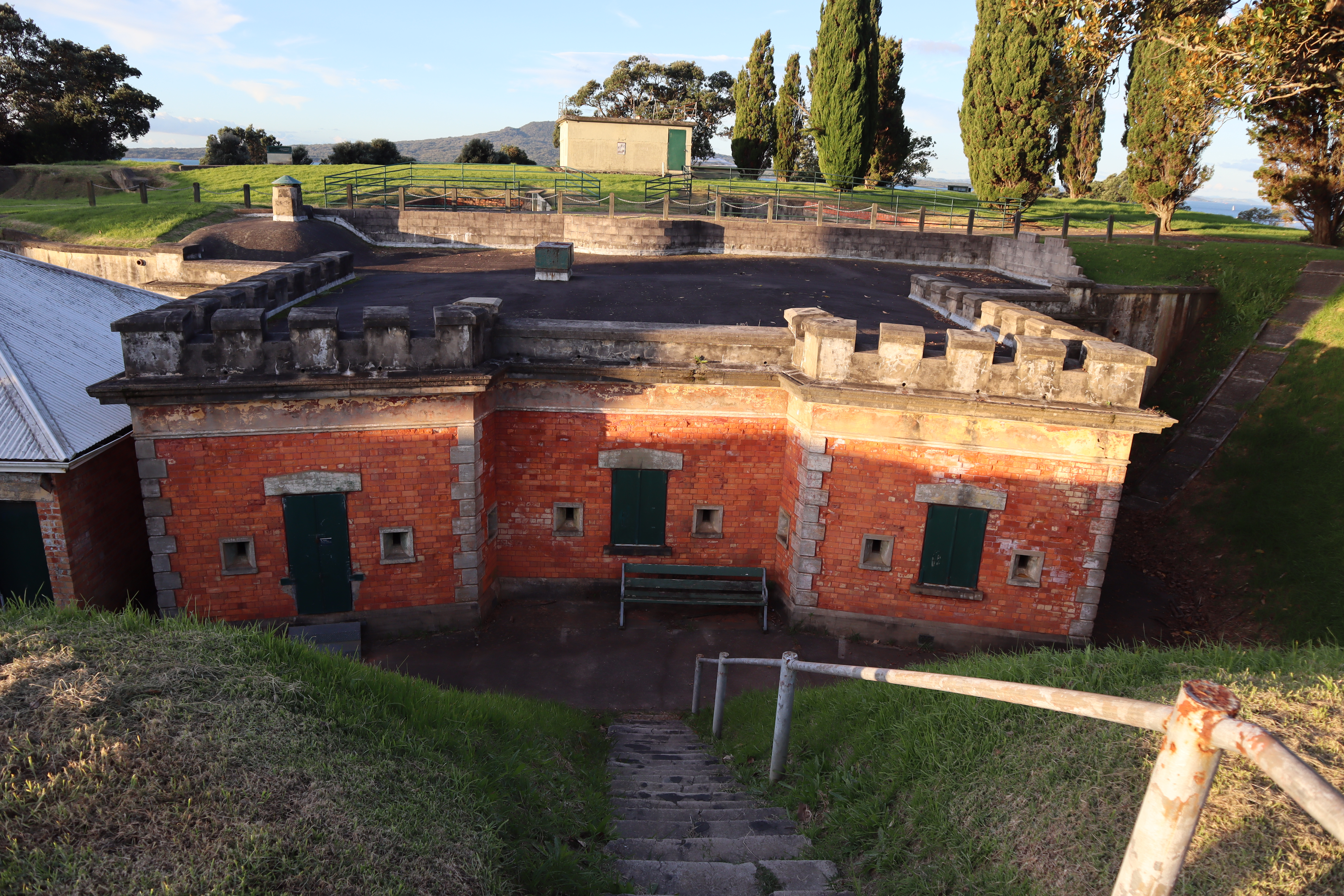
- Old Fort Building (1886)
- Interactive map of the Fort Takapuna area

General information
- Location: 2-14 Gillespie Place and Vauxhall Road, Narrow Neck, Auckland
- Coordinates: 36°48′58.47″S 174°48′17.43″E
- Construction started: 1886

Heritage New Zealand – Category 1
- Designated: 4 April 2001
- Reference no.: 86

Fort Takapuna is a fort in Auckland, New Zealand that was built in 1886 and is now a Department of Conservation and Category 1 Historic Place.

== History ==
The land was purchased for £17,000 in 1886. This was scandalous as the seller had rumouredly failed to sell the land for £3,000 in 1885.

Fort Takapuna was built between 1886 and 1889, based on a design by Major Tudor-Boddam of the Royal Artillery. It was part of a chain of defences around the Auckland harbour.

Between 1900 and 1914, the Fort was used as a depot for Volunteers and Territorial Forces. During World War I, Fort Takapuna was used as a training area for Māori and Cook Island reinforcements. It was also used for German prisoners of war in 1918. In 1919, the Fort was used as a hospital during the Spanish Flu.

The Royal New Zealand Navy first came to Fort Takapuna in 1927, after it was considered obsolete for the Royal New Zealand Army. From 1927 to 1937, it was used as a munitions depot. The Navy still has a base on the site.

At the start of World War II, the Fort was divided in two: the 4 inch guns and searchlights, and the District School of Instruction. A further 48 new buildings were built, and roads and parade grounds were created. This included barrack buildings that several of which were restored in 2014.

In 1963, the Royal New Zealand Navy moved its New Entry Training School from Motuihe Island to the Fort, and added a Gunnery and Officer Training School. Today, the Officer and Trade Training schools remain on part of the site.

On 18 June 2000, Fort Takapuna Historic Reserve, part of the site with the old fort and gun emplacements, was opened by the Minister of Conservation Sandra Lee.

== Description ==
The fort is made of several structures that were built over the history of the fort. Its early structures included a barrack building and the associated underground battery. These housed two 6 inch disappearing guns facing towards the Rangitoto Channel. There were also two smaller Nordenfelt guns installed. The guns were in the two circular gun pits in the underground part of the fort, and were scrapped in 1926.

In 1899, an underground steam engine room and two searchlights were added. One searchlight was in the tunnel on the right of the courtyard and the other to the west accessed from a tunnel at the back of the engine room. The searchlights were used until the end of World War II.

In 1927, the old fort was converted into storage for munitions, including roofing the gun pits were roofed and the building next to the old barracks. Additional magazines were also built near what is now playing fields.

In 1938, three 4-inch gun emplacements in the form of three white concrete structures on the cliff top. These guns were originally from HMS New Zealand. Two naval observation post buildings from the Puna Observation Post station.
