= North Head (New Zealand) =

Scoria cone in Auckland, New Zealand

- Maungauika / North Head
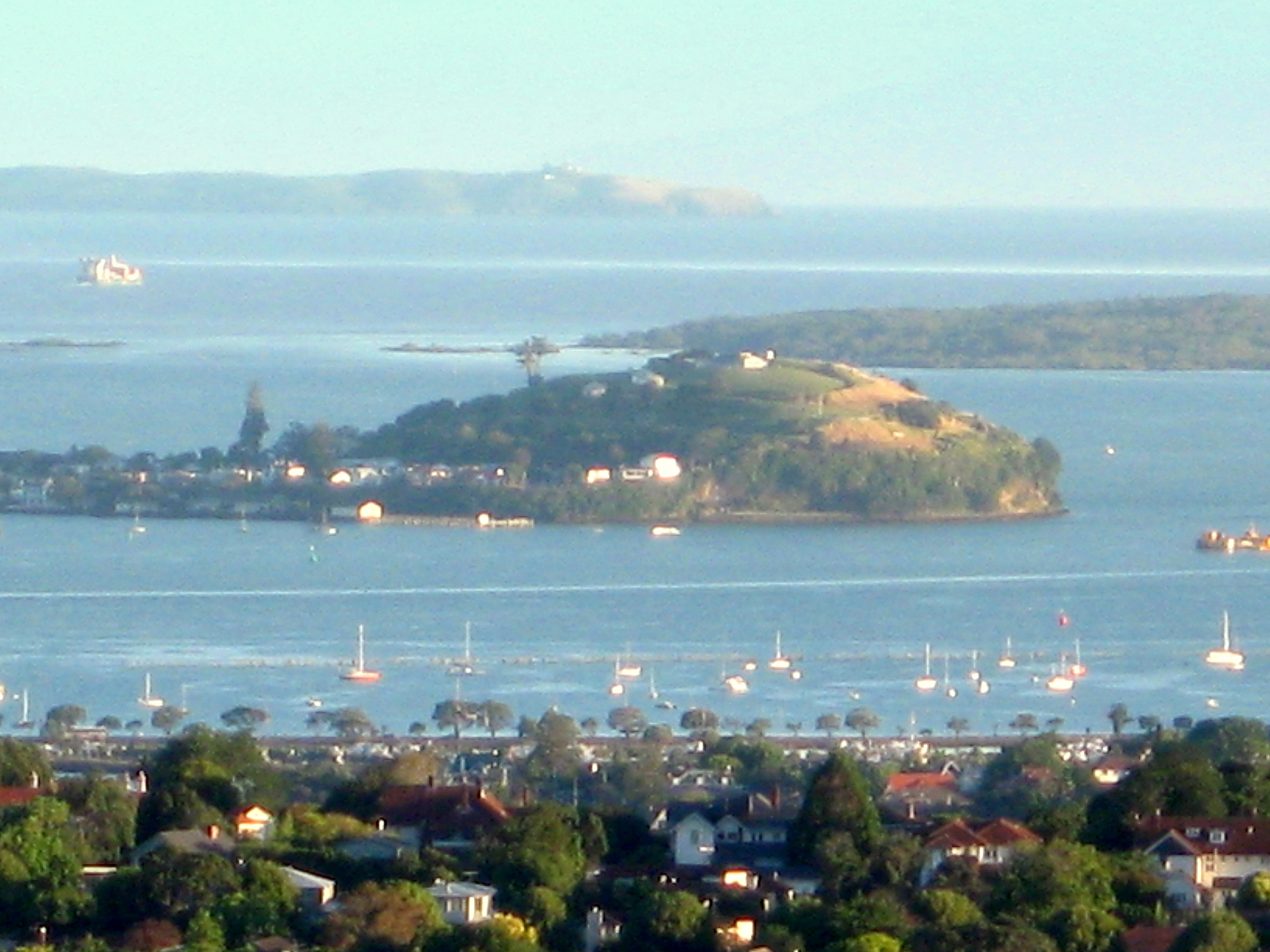
- North Head with the flanks of Rangitoto Island and the Hauraki Gulf beyond

Highest point
- Elevation: 50 m (160 ft)
- Coordinates: 36.827751°S 174.81205°E

Naming
- Native name: Maungauika (Māori)

Geography
- Location: North Island, New Zealand

Geology
- Volcanic field: Auckland volcanic field

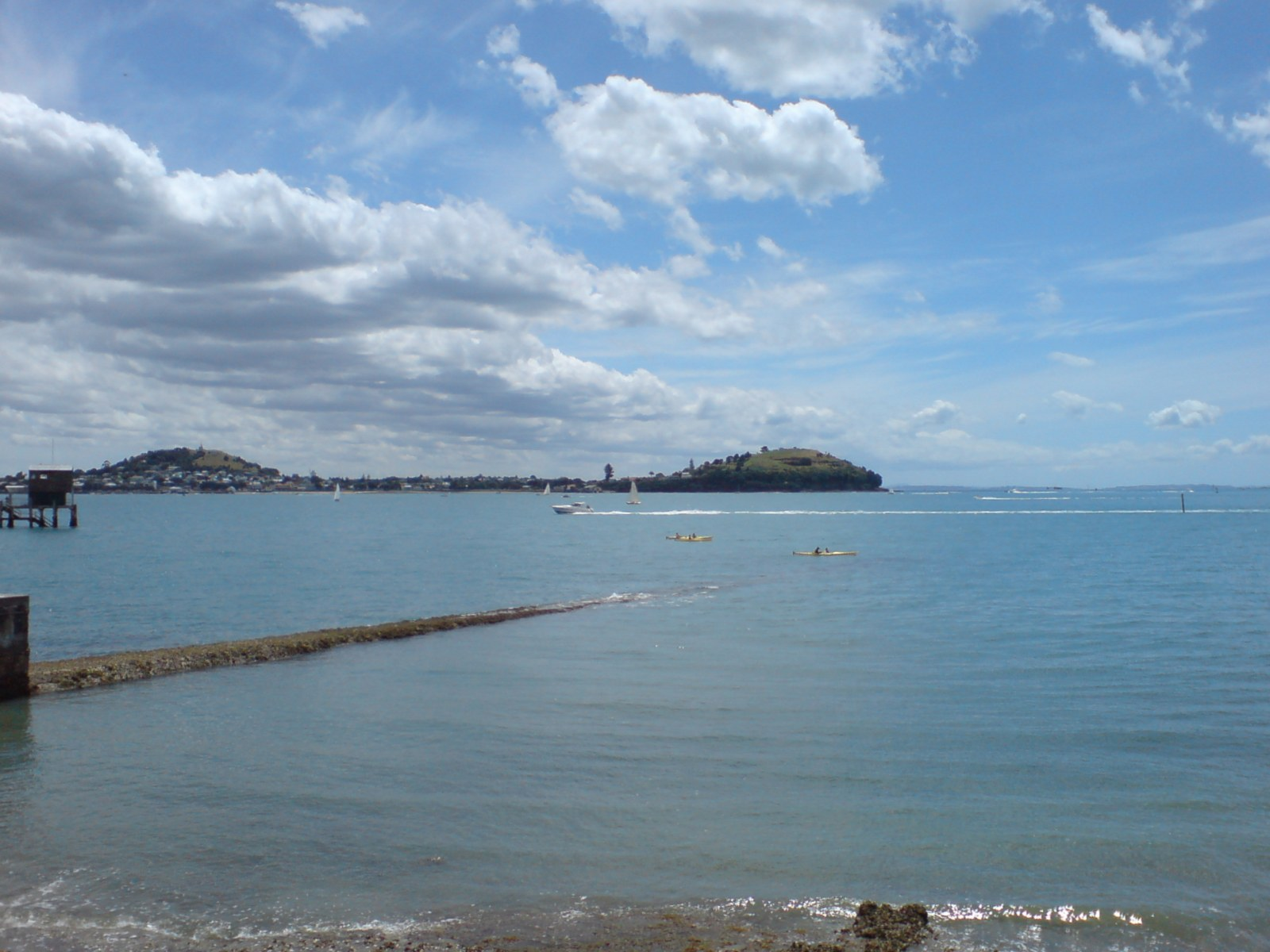
North Head seen from Tāmaki Drive to the south. Mount Victoria is seen to the west.

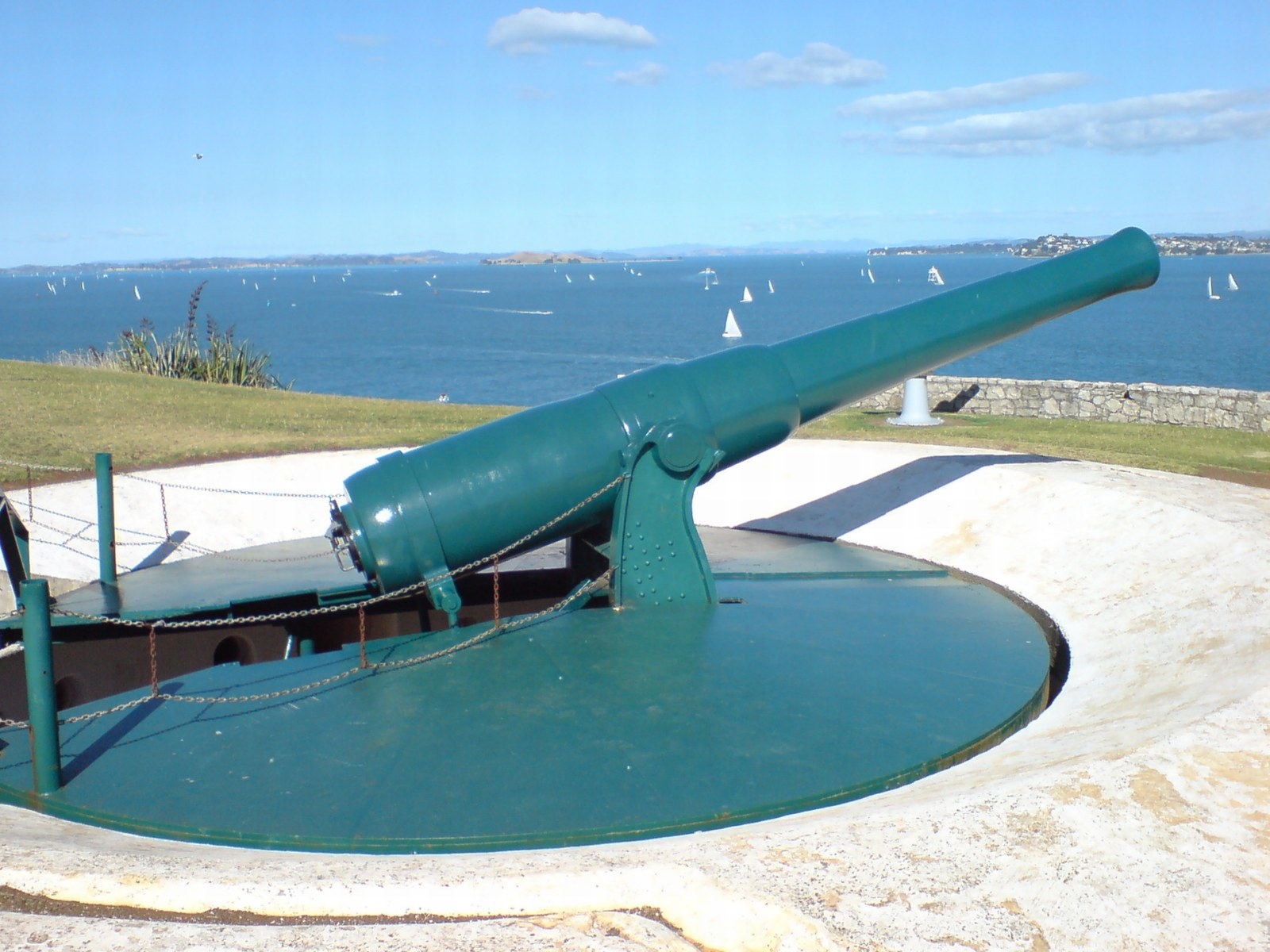
The BL 8 inch Mk VII of the South Battery, a well-preserved example of a disappearing gun

North Head (Māori: Maungauika; officially Maungauika and sometimes referred to as Maungauika / North Head) is a volcano and Tūpuna Maunga (ancestral mountain) forming a headland at the east end of the Waitematā Harbour in Auckland, New Zealand, in the suburb of Devonport. Known for its sweeping views over the harbour and the Hauraki Gulf, since 1885 the head was mainly used by the military as a coastal defence installation, which left a network of accessible old bunkers and tunnels as its legacy, forming part of the attraction. The site was protected as part of Hauraki Gulf Maritime Park in 1972 and listed as a Category I historic place in 2001. As part of a 2014 Treaty of Waitangi claim settlement the volcanic cone was officially named Maungauika and the reserve unofficially renamed Maungauika / North Head Historic Reserve.

== Etymology ==
Maungauika in the Māori language means "The Mountain of Uika", referring to a Tāmaki Māori ancestor thought to have lived here 800 years ago. The name North Head comes from the point's location at the northern entrance to the Waitematā Harbour.

== History ==
=== Māori usage ===
The original scoria cone has been substantially altered, first by marine erosion and later by the various generations of people who have occupied the headland. It was first used by Māori, and the Tainui waka was reputed to have put ashore close by at what is now Torpedo Bay. The Tainui people named the spring 'Takapuna', which was later used for the nearby beach. Some early photographs of the area show that they used to work gardens on the hill's lower slopes, though the pā fortifications of other cones in the area seem absent. European visitors during the 1850s have also described a settlement at the foot of the hill with gardens and racks for the drying of fish.

=== Military use ===
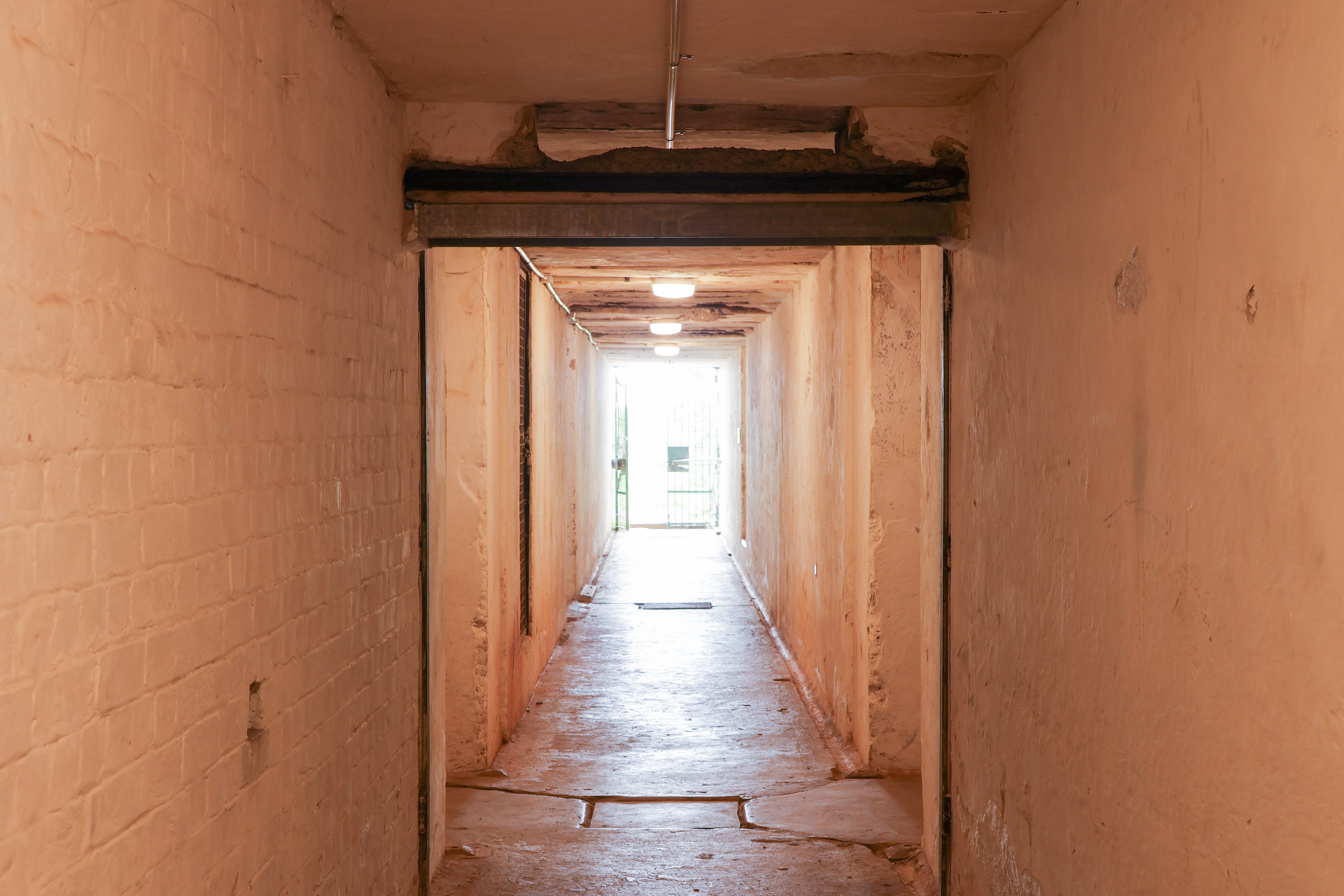
One of Maungauika / North Head's tunnels

North Head provided the settlement of Auckland with its first pilot station for the guiding of ships into the harbour. In 1878, the area was then set aside as a public reserve – with the stipulation that if necessary, it could be re-appropriated for the New Zealand Army to use for defence purposes. In 1885, this then became reality. When the Russian scare was at its height, forts were built in various places around Auckland to deter the Russians.

The defences consisted of three gun batteries: North Battery facing over the Rangitoto Channel, South Battery facing over the inner harbour, and Summit/Cautley Battery on the top of the hill. These first fortifications were hastily constructed, but later expanded and strengthened over 25 years by convict labour of up to 40 prisoners living in a barracks on the hilltop. The prisoners added extensive tunnel systems, underground store rooms, and various observation posts. The armaments of the fort included 64-pounder Armstrong disappearing guns, searchlights, and a remote-detonated naval minefield across the inner harbour to Bastion Point. None of the armaments were ever used in anger. A four-gun memorial saluting battery of 18-pounder World War I field guns was used, among other occasions, to salute Queen Elizabeth II on her visit in 1953.

In the 1930s, part of the fort received modernisation. Then during World War II, it became the administrative centre of Auckland's coast defenses, with the regimental headquarters buildings still surviving today. The coastal defences were scrapped in 1950, though one of the disappearing guns remained behind – obsolete and too difficult for the scrap merchant who bought it to disassemble and remove. After the army had left, the area was turned into a reserve again, though the New Zealand Navy kept an area around the summit for a training school.

=== Modern use ===
Since the Navy school left the summit area in 1996, the Department of Conservation has administered the area as a reserve, which provides for beautiful walks along the waterline or onto the summit with good views of Rangitoto Island and Auckland due to the prominent height of the hill. Also popular are exploratory forays to the gun emplacements and into the tunnel system, which is open to the public to a substantial degree, though torches are needed to explore it.

In the late 1980s and early 1990s there were reports of strange chemical smells and rumours of hidden caverns underneath the hill. Some tales even told of aeroplanes hidden in secret storerooms. As it was feared that old ammunition was decaying in forgotten parts of the fortifications, a major investigation was started, involving documentary research, geological tests and substantial exploratory digging was done around the hill. The research, however, yielded no new findings.

=== Treaty settlement ===
In the 2014 Treaty of Waitangi settlement between the Crown and the Ngā Mana Whenua o Tāmaki Makaurau collective of 13 Auckland iwi and hapū (also known as the Tāmaki Collective), ownership of the 14 Tūpuna Maunga (ancestral mountains) of Tāmaki Makaurau / Auckland, was vested to the collective, including the volcano officially named Maungauika. The legislation specified that the land be held in trust "for the common benefit of Ngā Mana Whenua o Tāmaki Makaurau and the other people of Auckland". The Tūpuna Maunga o Tāmaki Makaurau Authority or Tūpuna Maunga Authority (TMA) is the co-governance organisation established to administer the 14 Tūpuna Maunga. Auckland Council manages the Tūpuna Maunga under the direction of the TMA.

== See also ==
- Coastal fortifications of New Zealand
