= Ripapa Island =

Island in New Zealand

Native name: Rīpapa (Māori)
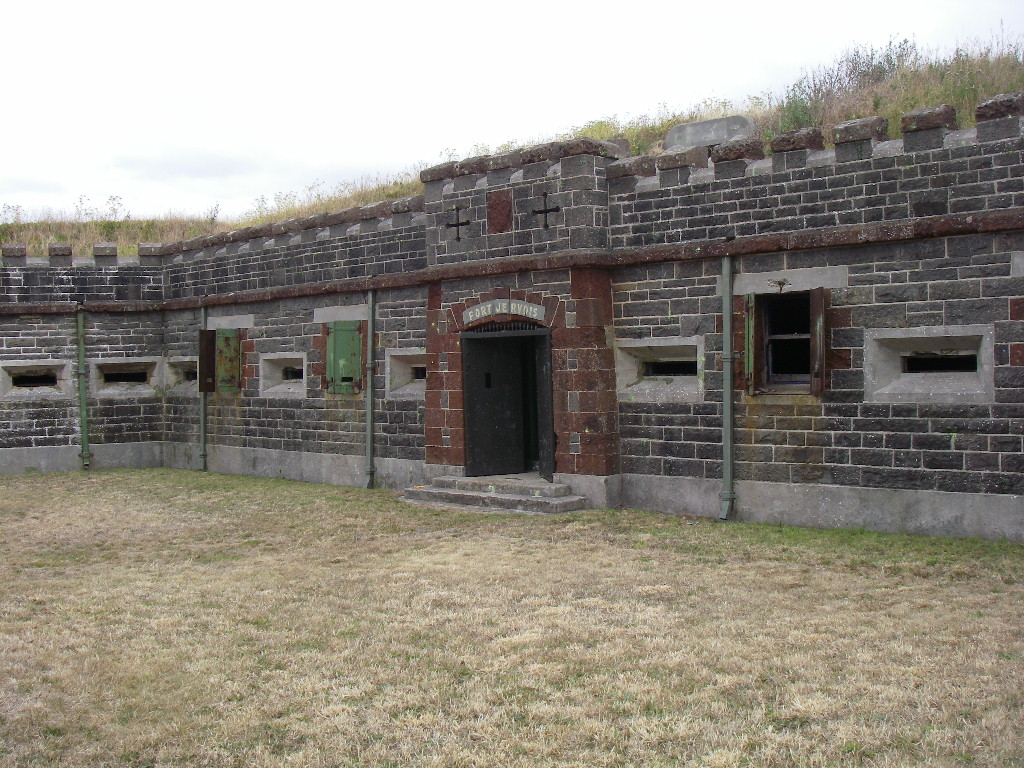
- Fort Jervois

- Location of Ripapa Island

Geography
- Coordinates: 43.6201°S 172.7544°E

Administration
- New Zealand

Demographics
- Population: 0

Heritage New Zealand – Category 1
- Official name: Fort Jervois
- Designated: 22 August 1991
- Reference no.: 5306

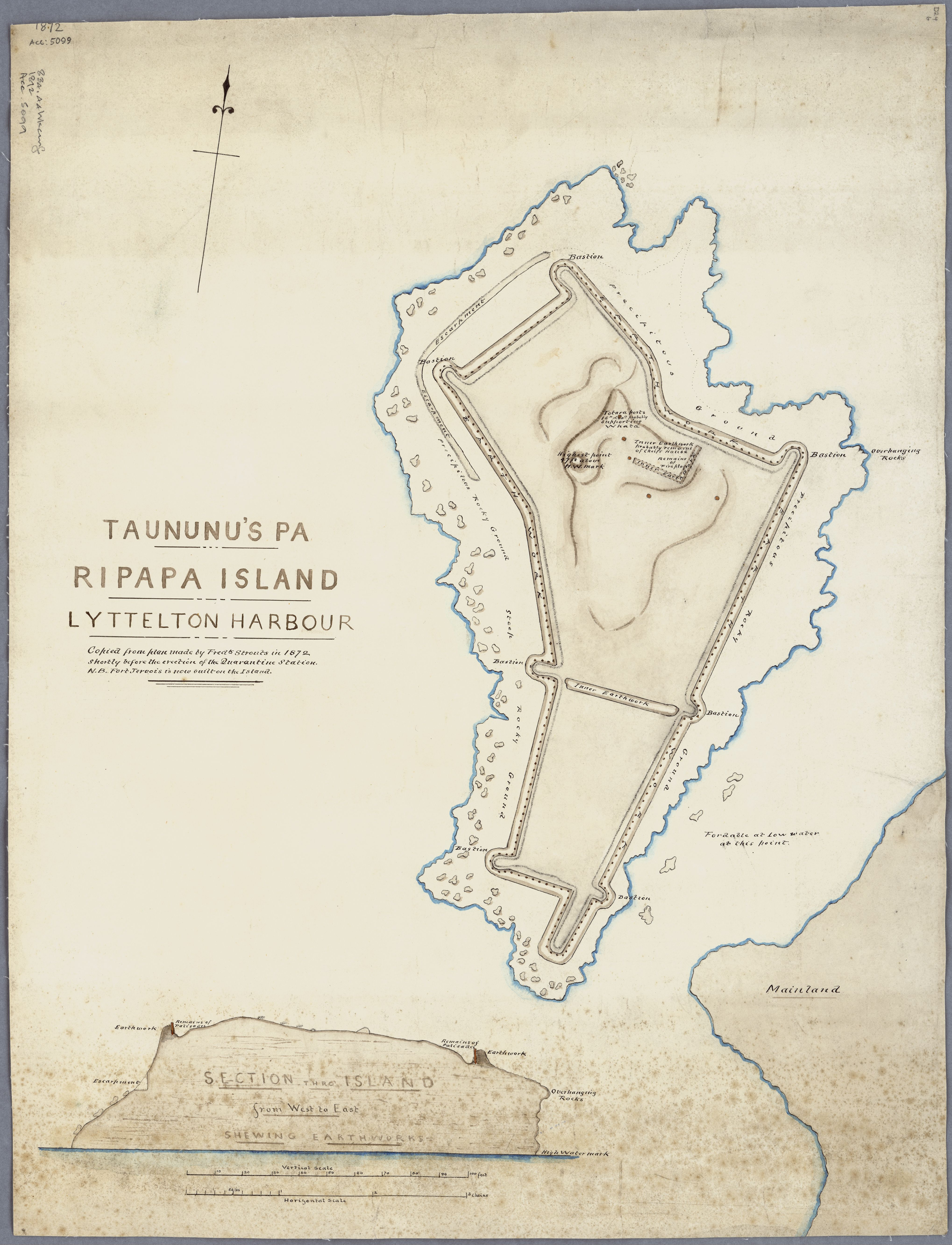
1872 map of Ripapa Island

Ripapa Island (Māori: Rīpapa), also known earlier as Ripa Island, located just off the shore of Lyttelton Harbour, has played many roles in the history of New Zealand. A Māori fortified pā there played a key role in an internal struggle for the South Island Ngāi Tahu tribe in the early 19th century. Between 1873 and 1885, the island hosted a quarantine station, which was also used as a temporary prison for members of the Parihaka Māori settlement in Taranaki. Fort Jervois was built in 1886 as part of system of defences against a feared Russian invasion. The fort was in military use until the end of World War I, and again during World War II. It is the most complete Russian-scare fort still existing in New Zealand.

== 19th century Māori history ==
Ripapa Island was a perfect location for a pā (a fortification built by the Māori) and chief Taununu of the Ngāi Tahu tribe built one there in the early 19th century. In the 1820s, Taununu faced a fierce fight with another Ngāi Tahu group, in what was to be known as the kai huanga feud. Kai huanga, meaning "eat relatives", refers to the cannibalistic nature of the feud and that those they fought and ate were close relatives, even getting to a point where cousin would eat cousin. The Ngāi Tahu tribe continued to occupy the island until around 1832. Prior to this, chief Te Whakarukeruke, who had been occupying Ripapa Island, left to help defend Kaiapoi from Te Rauparaha. After Kaiapoi fell, Te Rauparaha overran a number of pā on and around Banks Peninsula, including the pā on Ripapa Island. The island was never again occupied by Māori.

== Quarantine station and prison ==
Between 1873 and 1885, the island was used as a quarantine station for ships arriving from Britain to the nearby port in Lyttelton. In 1880 the quarantine buildings were used as a prison, notably for members of the Parihaka Māori settlement in Taranaki during its passive resistance campaign against the surveying and selling of its land by the government. The quarantine buildings were dismantled and moved to Quail Island in 1885, to be replaced by a coastal defence fort on Ripapa.

== Fort Jervois ==
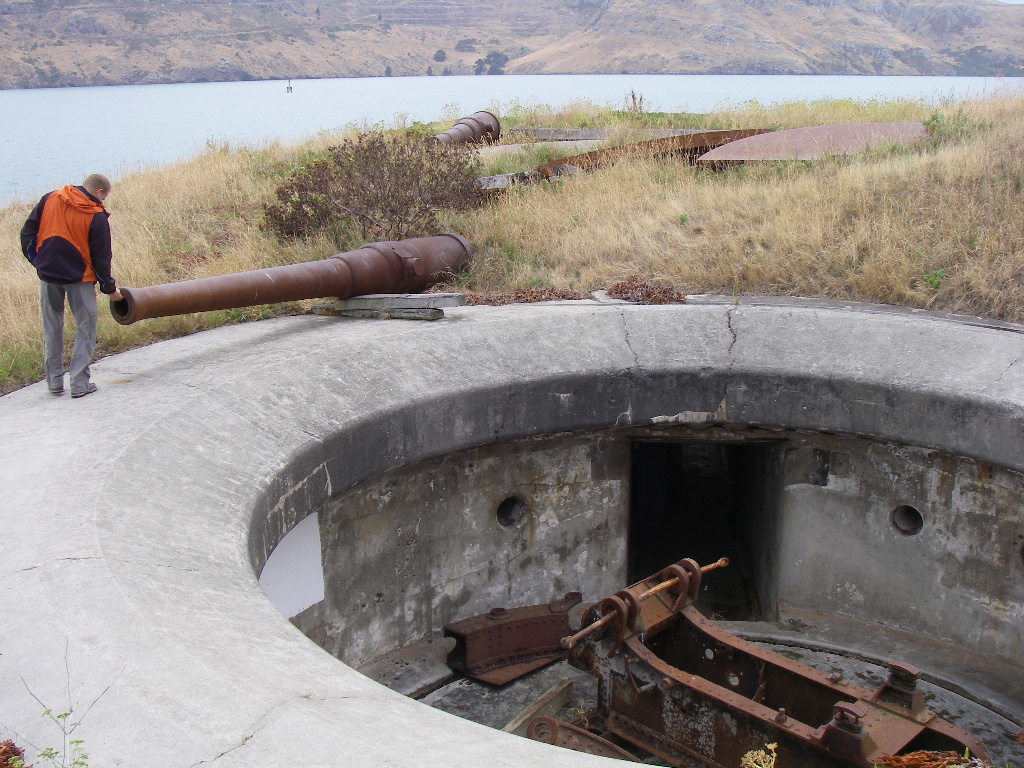
Derelict Armstrong guns and emplacements

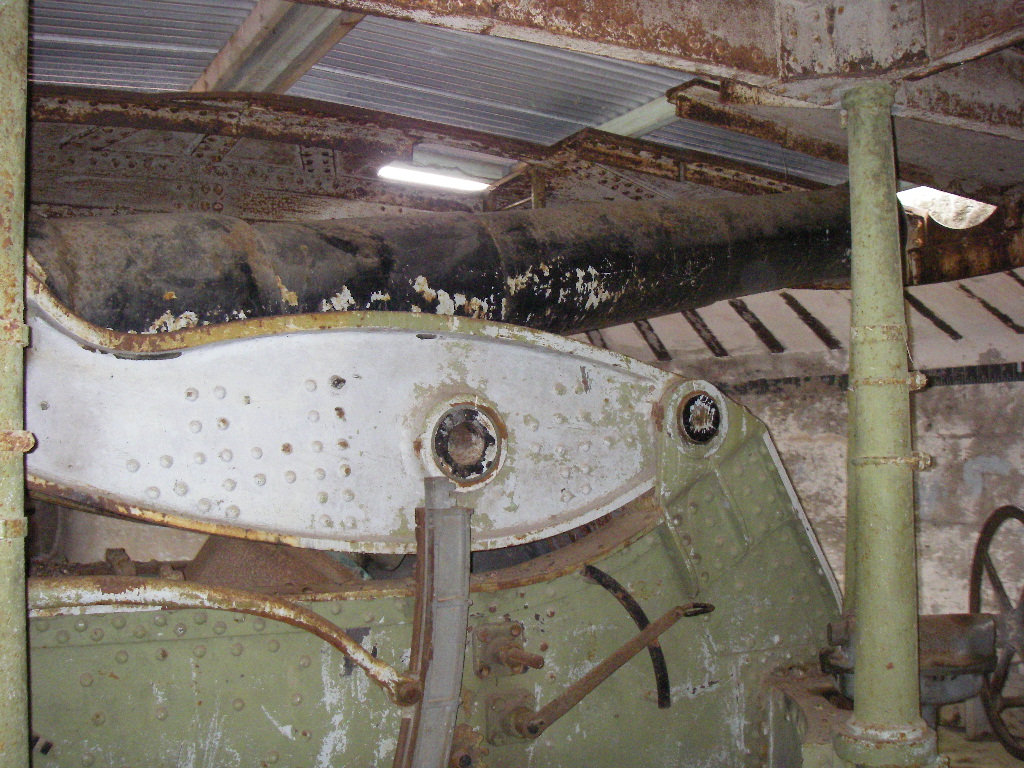
8-inch Armstrong gun mechanism

A walled fort, initially named Fort Ripa, was built on Ripapa in 1886 as part of a nationwide coastal defence system constructed due to the Russian scare, a fear that Russia would invade New Zealand. One of four fortifications set up to protect Lyttelton Harbour, it was renamed Fort Jervois after Lieutenant General Sir William Jervois in 1888. Four disappearing guns were installed by 1889. The fort was occupied by the New Zealand army until the end of World War I, during which it housed some prisoners of war, including Felix von Luckner. It was again garrisoned during World War II.

The fort is currently the home of two rare guns. One is a BL 8-inch gun (one of only 12 left in the world), which is still in working order, though there are no shells left for such a weapon. It also holds a smaller BL 6-inch gun. However, at the first test shot the recoil system failed, with the result that the barrel cracked and most of the rest of the gun was damaged and was returned to England for repairs. A test fire in 1939 cracked the mounting. Though these are the only two guns currently in place at Fort Jervois, there are emplacements for another two guns. These two guns are on the island but have been partially destroyed.

The island has been under the control of the Department of Conservation since 1990. Fort Jervois is classed as a Category I historic place by Heritage New Zealand, and has been considered "actively managed" by the Department of Conservation. It is the most complete Russian-scare fort still existing in New Zealand.

The June 2011 Christchurch earthquake damaged Fort Jervois and it was closed for some time. Remedial repairs were made, and the island reopened in November 2019, with public ferry services from Lyttelton wharf resuming in 2020.

== See also ==
- History of the Canterbury region
- Coastal fortifications of New Zealand
- List of islands of New Zealand
