= Fort Buckley =

Historic gun emplacement in Wellington, New Zealand

Coordinates: 41°15′39″S 174°47′16″E

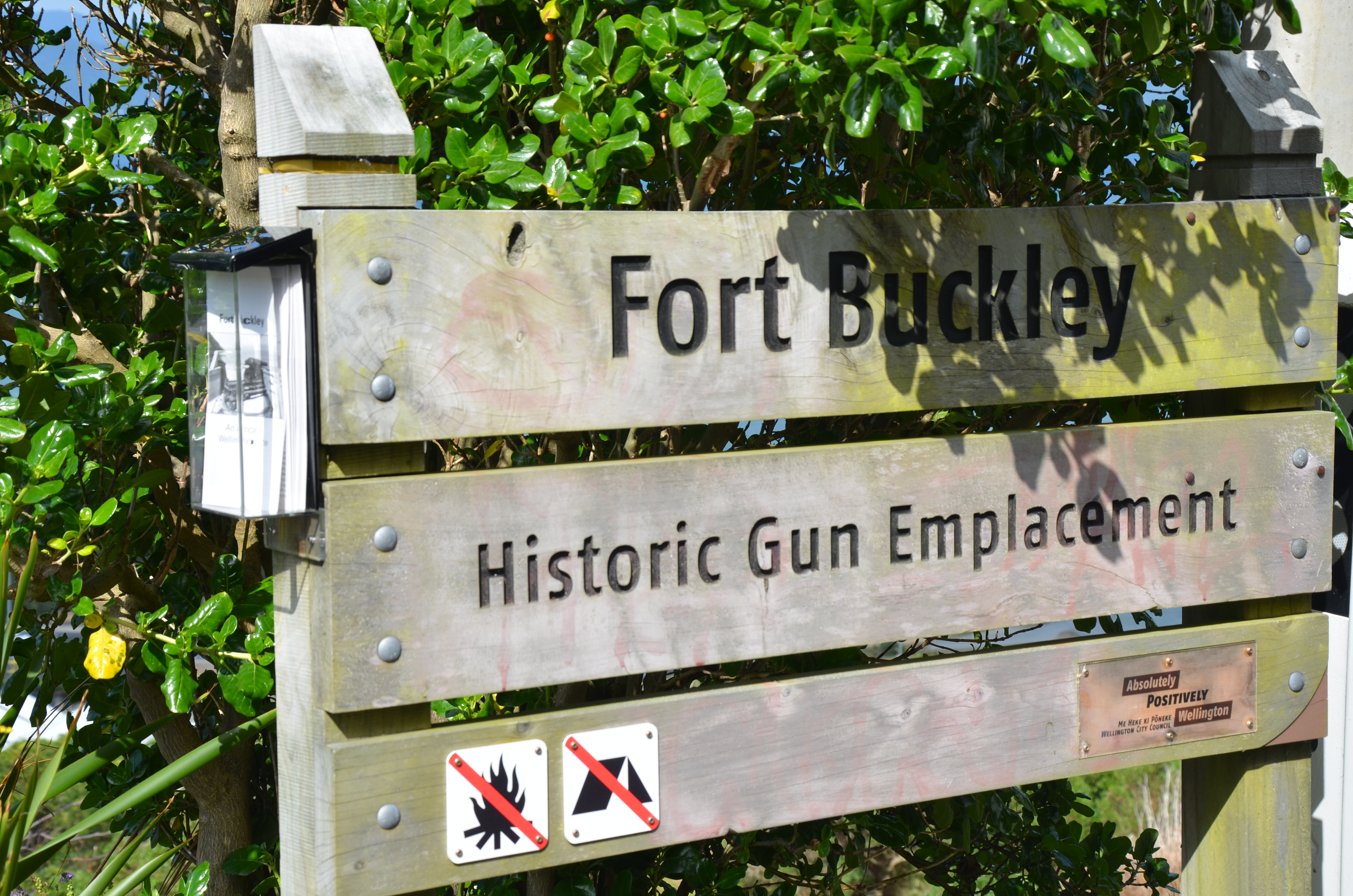

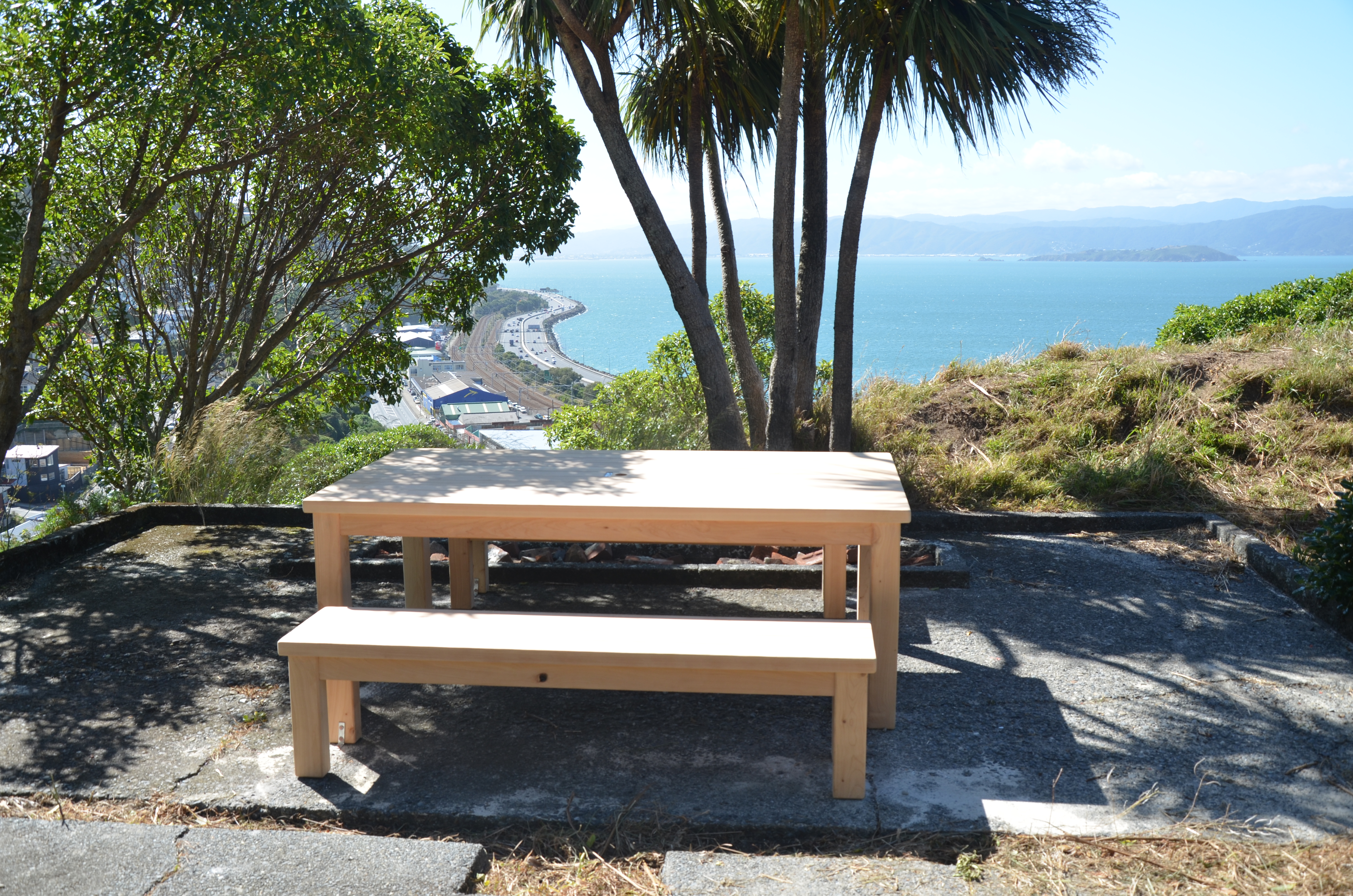
HPPA Picnic table sited on old Cottage pad

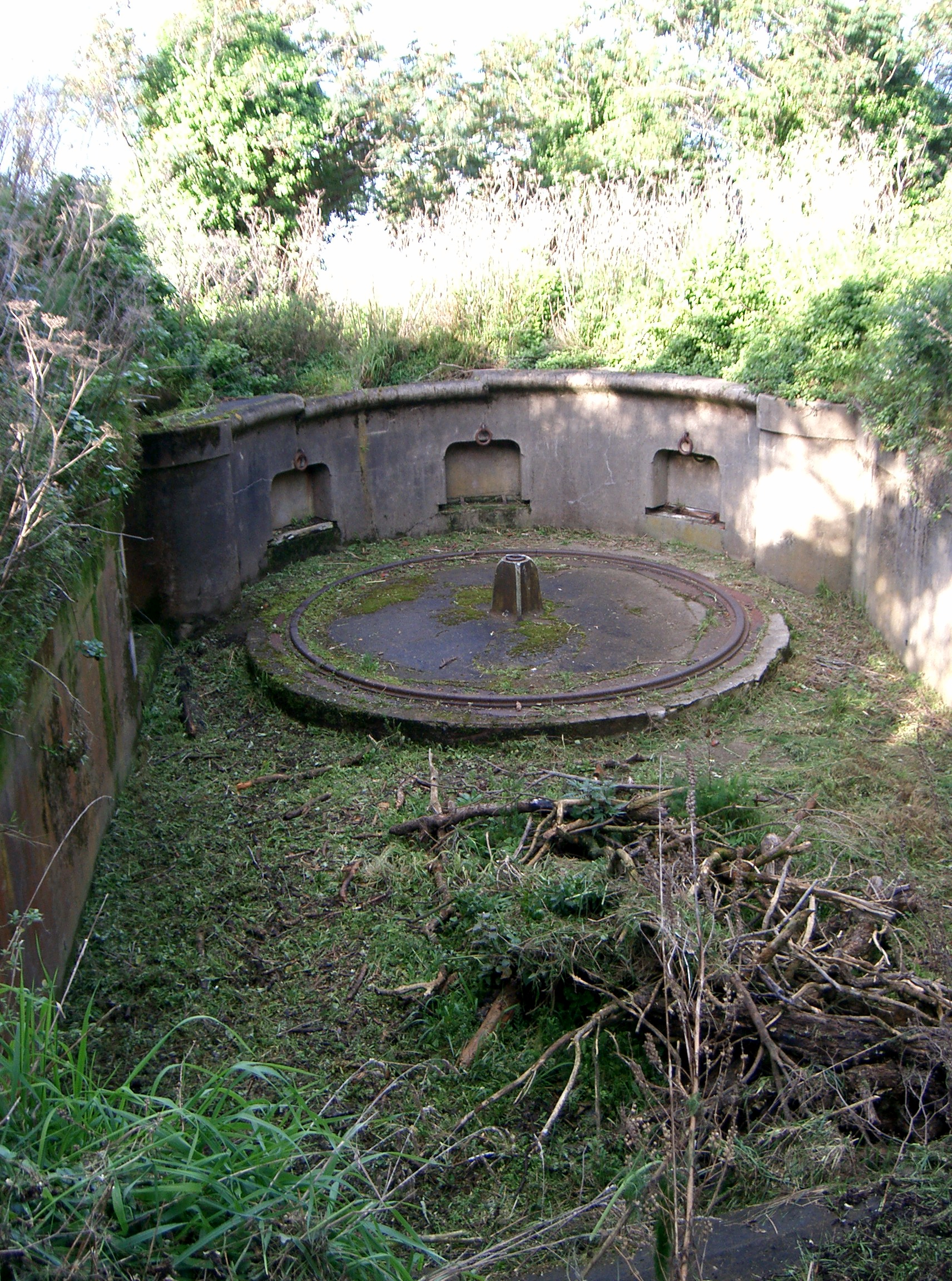

Fort Buckley was a defensive fort built in Wellington, New Zealand in 1885, overlooking the port of Wellington and Wellington Harbour. The remains of the fort are listed as a Category 1 Historic Place by Heritage New Zealand.

The fort included two rifled 64 pounder muzzle-loading guns, which had a range of about three kilometres.

The fort was named after Patrick Buckley, an Irish New Zealand soldier, lawyer, and politician.

An original photo of the guns is shown on the Capital Defence site - "Sixty four pound gun at Fort Buckley, Kaiwharawhara, Wellington" 1886. A site map of the original fort is also shown on the Capital Defence website.

During World War 2 an anti-aircraft gun was installed on the former caretaker's cottage area located in the slopes above the gun-pits and midway up the overall site.

Today only the concrete foundations of the two RML gun-pits remain, but the anti-aircraft gun's original location used on the old caretaker's cottage pad during World War 2 is harder to spot, though the concrete pad foundation of the cottage is obvious.

The Fort Buckley site land is now owned by the Wellington City Council and has been set aside as a reserve since 2010. Since becoming a reserve, the Fort Buckley site is now highly accessible, with a well-formed gravel path installed and a prominently sign posted and fenced site entrance from Barnard Street in Wadestown, Wellington.

The path to the fort has been cleared of vegetation and scrub many times over the years (the area has had several scrub fires), and at times the cuttings have been dumped in the gun pits and built up. The Fort Buckley site is now regularly maintained and enhanced by the Highland Park Progressive Association (HPPA) residents' group in partnership with the Wellington City Council.

The HPPA has researched a detailed pamphlet about the history of Fort Buckley and copies are available from a container beside the wooden Fort Buckley sign.

Various community social activities, including family picnics, geocaching, track walking, are regularly taking place onsite. During March 2014 the HPPA installed a large picnic table on the former caretaker's cottage concrete pad and significantly sprayed and cleared further vegetation with assistance of teams from the Wellington City Council.

Heritage New Zealand lists Fort Buckley as being of national historical significance. The long-term goal is to either locate the original 64-pounder guns, which are believed to be buried in Palmerston North, or to have replica iron guns cast to be placed in the two-gun pits.

== See also ==
- Coastal fortifications of New Zealand
