= 5th Anti-Tank Regiment, Royal New Zealand Artillery =

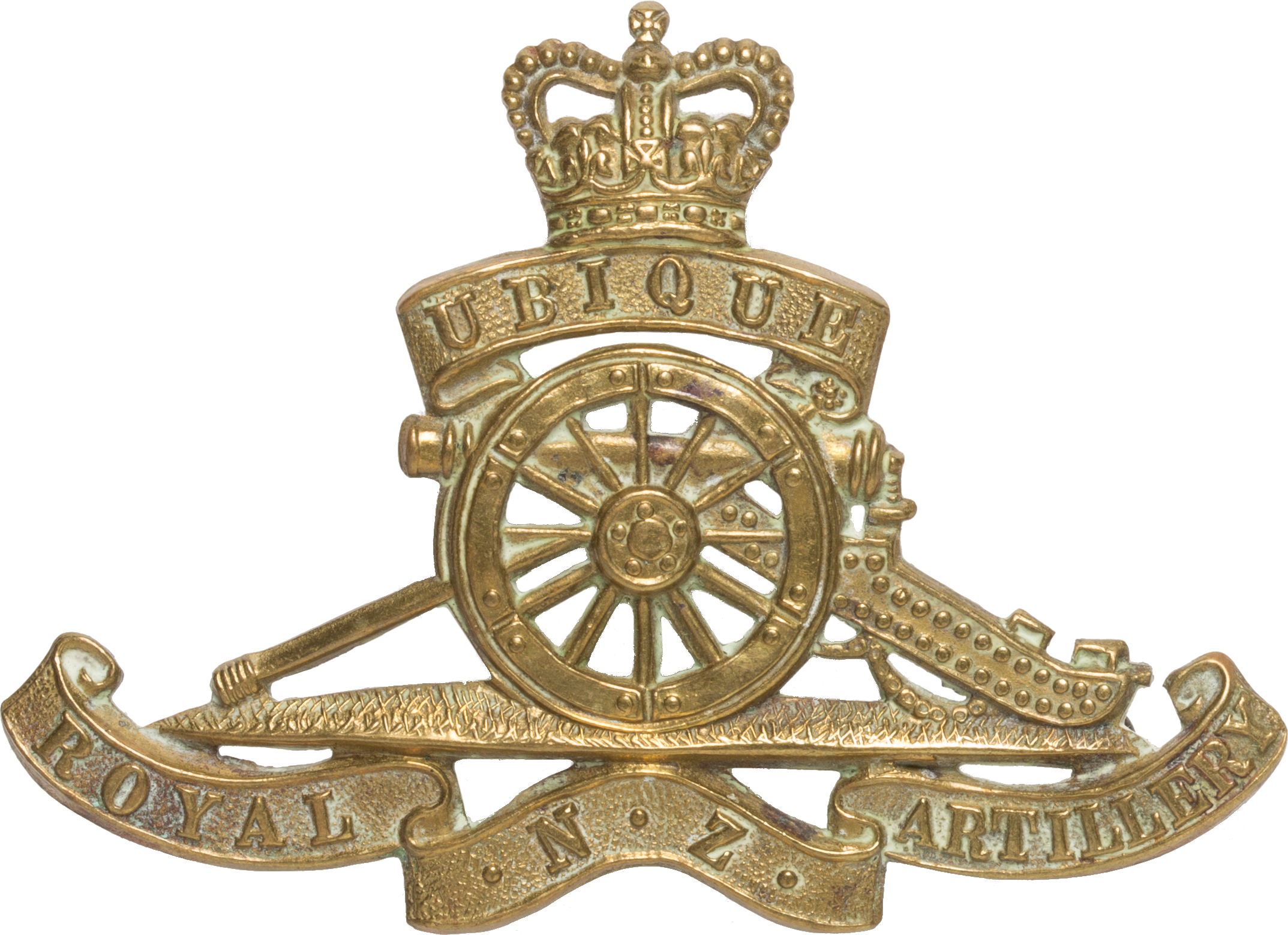
- Cap badge of the Royal New Zealand Artillery
- Active: 1948–1950
- Country: New Zealand
- Branch: New Zealand Army
- Type: Anti-Tank Artillery
- Garrison/HQ: Invercargill

The 5th Anti-Tank Regiment, Royal New Zealand Artillery was a territorial artillery regiment of the New Zealand Army. It was formed in 1948 and was equipped with 17-pounder anti-tank guns. In 1949 it was decided to convert the regiment to self-propelled 25-pounders and to add a troop of 4.2 inch mortars, similar to the organisation of 7th Anti-Tank regiment during the latter phases of WWII. The conversion, however, was never completed and the regiment was disbanded in 1950. A 4.2 inch mortar battery was subsequently formed and would go on to become 5th Light Regiment.
