= 9th Coast Regiment, Royal New Zealand Artillery =

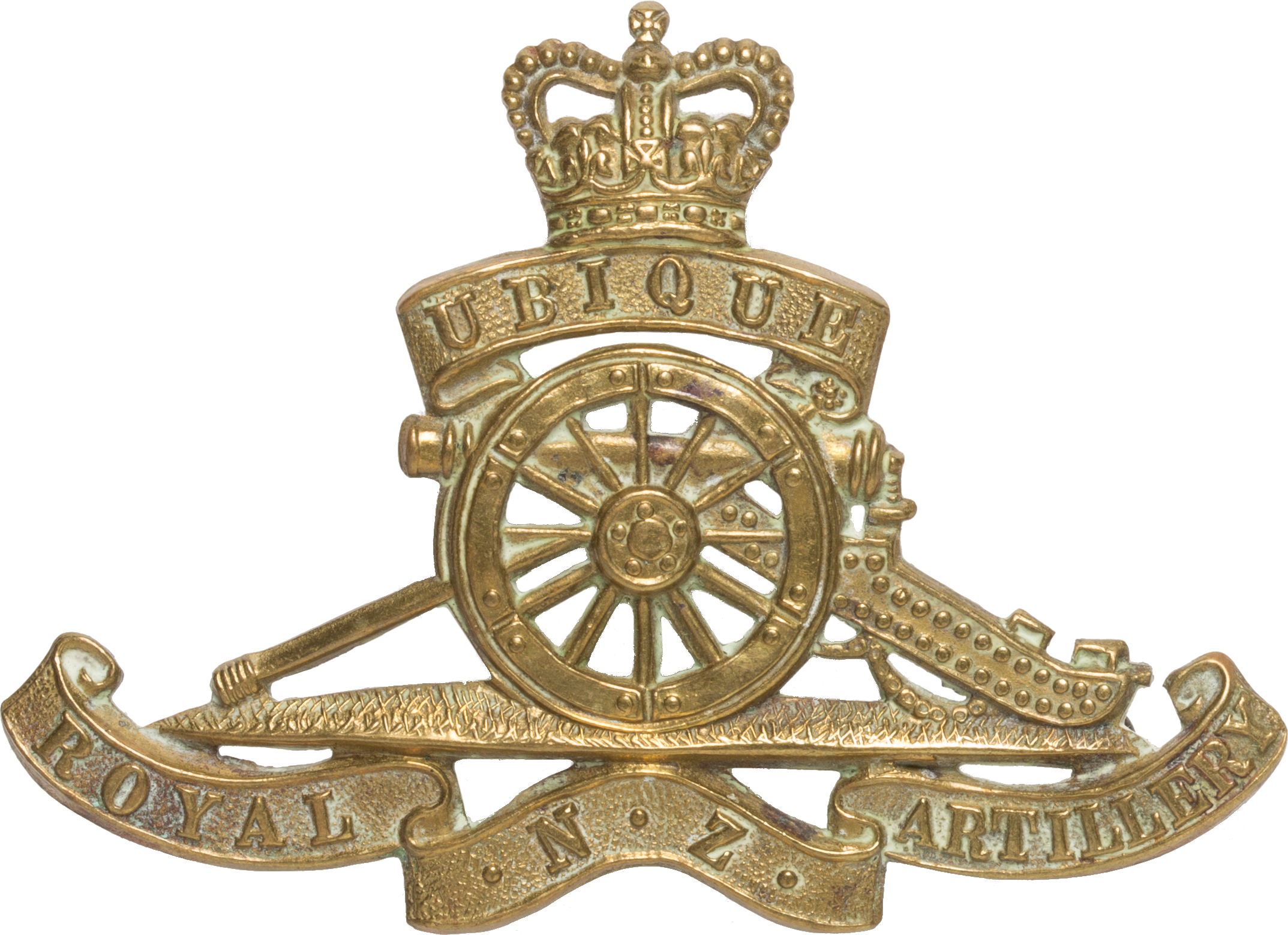
- Cap badge of the Royal New Zealand Artillery
- Active: 1940–1967
- Country: New Zealand
- Branch: New Zealand Army
- Type: Coastal Artillery

The 9th Coast Regiment, Royal New Zealand Artillery was a territorial coastal artillery regiment of the New Zealand Army. The regiment was formed in 1940 as 9th Heavy Regiment, New Zealand Artillery and controlled the coastal defence batteries around Auckland. The regiment was progressively expanded and by the end of the war had batteries all over the upper North Island. The regiment was reduced to a cadre in 1957 and disbanded in 1967, along with the other coastal artillery regiments (10th and 11th).

== History ==
Since the First World War, the coastal defences of Auckland had come under a single battery, 13 Heavy Battery (13 Coast Battery prior to 1934). In March 1940, 13 Heavy Battery was broken up into three batteries and the overall force increased in manpower. The 9th Heavy Regiment was formed in July 1940 to command the Auckland defence batteries, which included both coastal artillery and anti-aircraft artillery. In 1941, the regiment was expanded to include the coastal artillery batteries which covered other ports in the upper North Island. At its peak size in 1943, the regiment consisted of nine batteries:

- 60 Battery (Motutapu Island: three 6" Mk XXI guns)
- 61 Battery (Fort Cautley: two 4" Mk VII, two 12-pounder and four 6-pounder guns; Bastion Point: two 12-pounder and one twin 6-pounder guns; Great Barrier Island: one 6" Mk VII, one 4" Mk VII and four 40 mm Bofors guns. Manukau: one 4.7" gun; Motuihe Island: two 4" Mk VII guns)
- 62 Battery (Fort Takapuna: two 4" Mk VII guns)
- 63 Battery (Castor Bay: two 6" Mk VII Guns)
- 64 Battery (Whangaparaoa: two 6" Mk VII guns)
- 68 Battery (Bay of Islands: four 6" Mk VII and eight 40-mm Bofors guns; Whangaparaoa: one 6" Mk VII gun)
- 139 Battery (Whangārei: one 5" Mk VIII gun)
- 163 Battery (Whangaparaoa: two 9.2" Mk XV guns)
- 164 Battery (Waiheke Island: two 9.2" Mk XV guns)

The name of the regiment was changed to 9th Coast Regiment in October 1944 and in the same year, the coastal defences were effectively mothballed. After the war it was decided that only the defences at Auckland should be kept in an operational state by a small peacetime garrison. In 1948 the territorial force was reorganised. All the New Zealand Artillery became part of the Royal New Zealand Artillery and the batteries were renumbered as:

- 91 Battery (North Head)
- 93 Battery (Motutapu)
- 94 Battery (Castor Bay)
- 95 Battery (Whangaparoa)
- 96 Battery (Waiheke)

It was decided in 1957 that the coastal artillery regiments were no longer necessary. That decision may have been connected to the British turn towards missiles as expressed by the 1957 Defence White Paper. The armament and equipment were placed on a care and maintenance basis, while the regiment was reduced to a cadre. Over the coming years, the equipment was scrapped and much of the facilities and land were sold off. The regiment eventually dropped to a single quartermaster sergeant, but continued to exist on paper until it was formally disbanded in 1967.

== Notes ==
Citations

References

- Cooke, Peter (2016). Defending New Zealand: Ramparts on the Seas 1840-1950s. Wellington: Defence of New Zealand Study Group. ISBN 978-0-473-06833-2.
- Cooke, Peter; Crawford, J. (2011). The Territorials. Auckland: Random House. ISBN 978-1-86979-446-0.
- Henderson, Alan; Green, David; Cooke, Peter D. F. (2008). The Gunners: A History of New Zealand Artillery. Auckland: Reed Publishing. ISBN 978-07900-1141-7.
- Cooke, Peter (2020). Wrights Hill: New Zealand's 9.2-inch Coast Defence Batteries. Wellington: Defence of New Zealand Study Group. ISBN 978-0-473-50506-6.
