= 4th Artillery Regiment =

4th Artillery Regiment may refer to:

== Australia ==
- 4th Regiment, Royal Australian Artillery
- 2/4th Field Regiment (Australia)
- 2/4th Anti-Tank Regiment (Australia)

== Italy ==
- 4th Anti-Aircraft Artillery Regiment "Peschiera"
- 4th Heavy Field Artillery Regiment (Italy)
- 4th Mountain Artillery Regiment (Italy)

== United Kingdom ==
- 4th Regiment Royal Artillery
- 4th Searchlight Regiment, Royal Artillery/Royal Malta Artillery
- 4th Lancashire Artillery Volunteers

== United States ==
- 4th Air Defense Artillery Regiment
- 4th Field Artillery Regiment
- 4th Continental Artillery Regiment
- 4th Massachusetts Heavy Artillery Regiment

== Other countries ==
- 4th Artillery Regiment (General Support), Royal Canadian Artillery
- 4th Field Regiment (New Zealand)
- 4th Medium Regiment, Royal New Zealand Artillery
- 4th Artillery Regiment (Portugal)
