= 13th Coast Regiment, New Zealand Artillery =

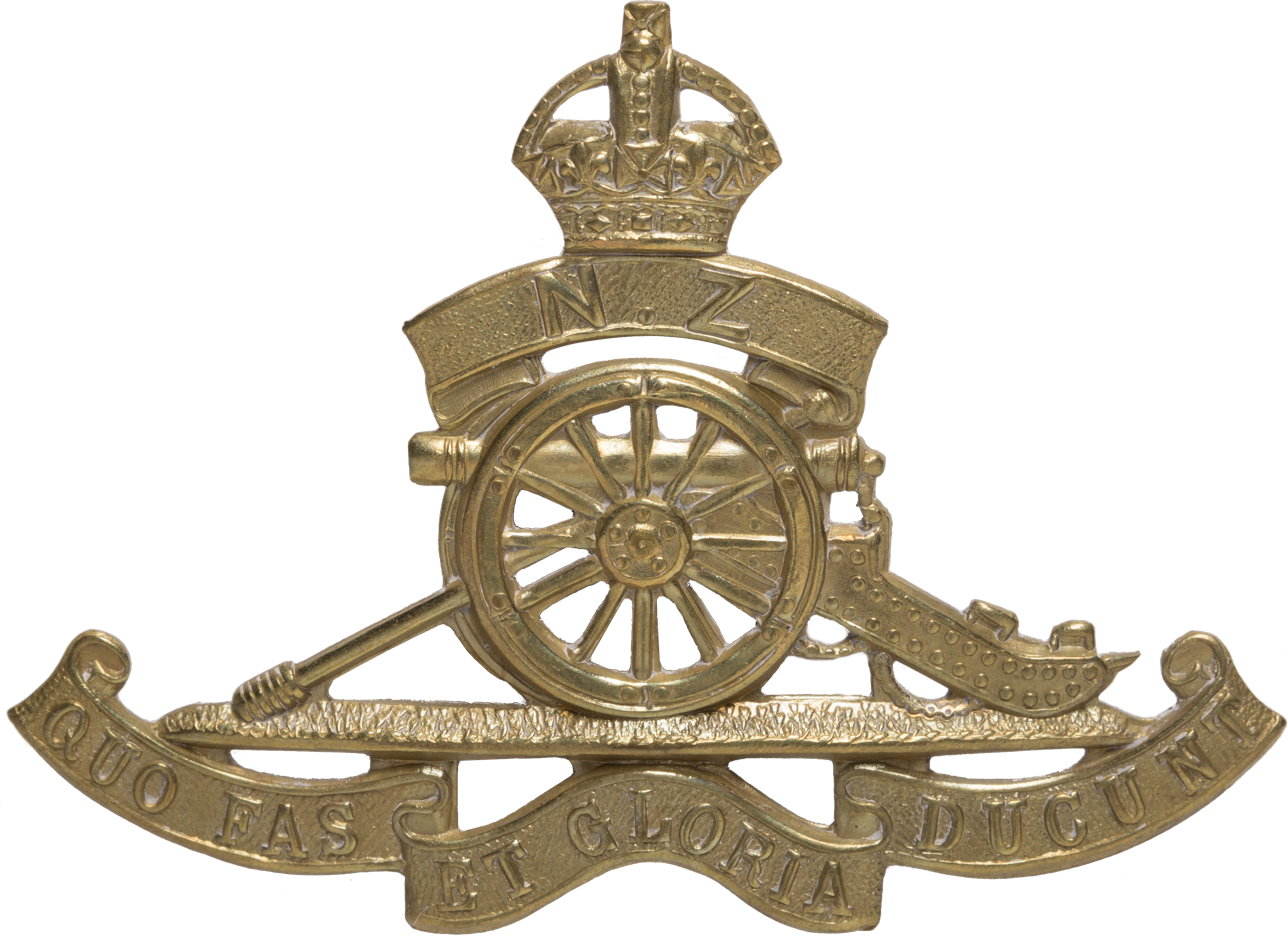
- Cap badge of the New Zealand Artillery
- Active: 1943
- Country: New Zealand
- Branch: Army
- Type: Artillery
- Role: Coastal Artillery
- Size: One regiment
- Part of: New Zealand Artillery
- Garrison/HQ: Dunedin, New Zealand
- Motto(s): Ubique (Everywhere) (Latin)
- March: Quick — The Right of the Line; Slow — The Duchess of Kent

Commanders
- Captain General: HM The Queen

The 13th Coast Regiment, New Zealand Artillery was a coastal artillery regiment of the New Zealand Military Forces. It was formed in May 1943 from the coastal defence batteries based in the lower South Island, which were formerly part of 11th Coast Regiment. The regiment consisted of:

- 82 Battery (Taiaroa Head: one 6" EOC gun; Rerewahine: two 6" Mk VII guns; Tomahawk Beach: two 6" Mk VII guns; Harrington Point: two twin 6-pounder guns and two 6-pounder guns)
- 141 Battery (Oamaru: one 5" Mk VIII gun)
- 142 Battery (Bluff: 6" Mk VII gun)

The 13th Coast Regiment was disbanded in December 1943 and the batteries returned to the 11th Coast Regiment.

== Affiliations ==
- United Kingdom — Royal Artillery
- Canada — Royal Canadian Artillery
- Australia — Royal Australian Artillery
