= 10th Coast Regiment, Royal New Zealand Artillery =

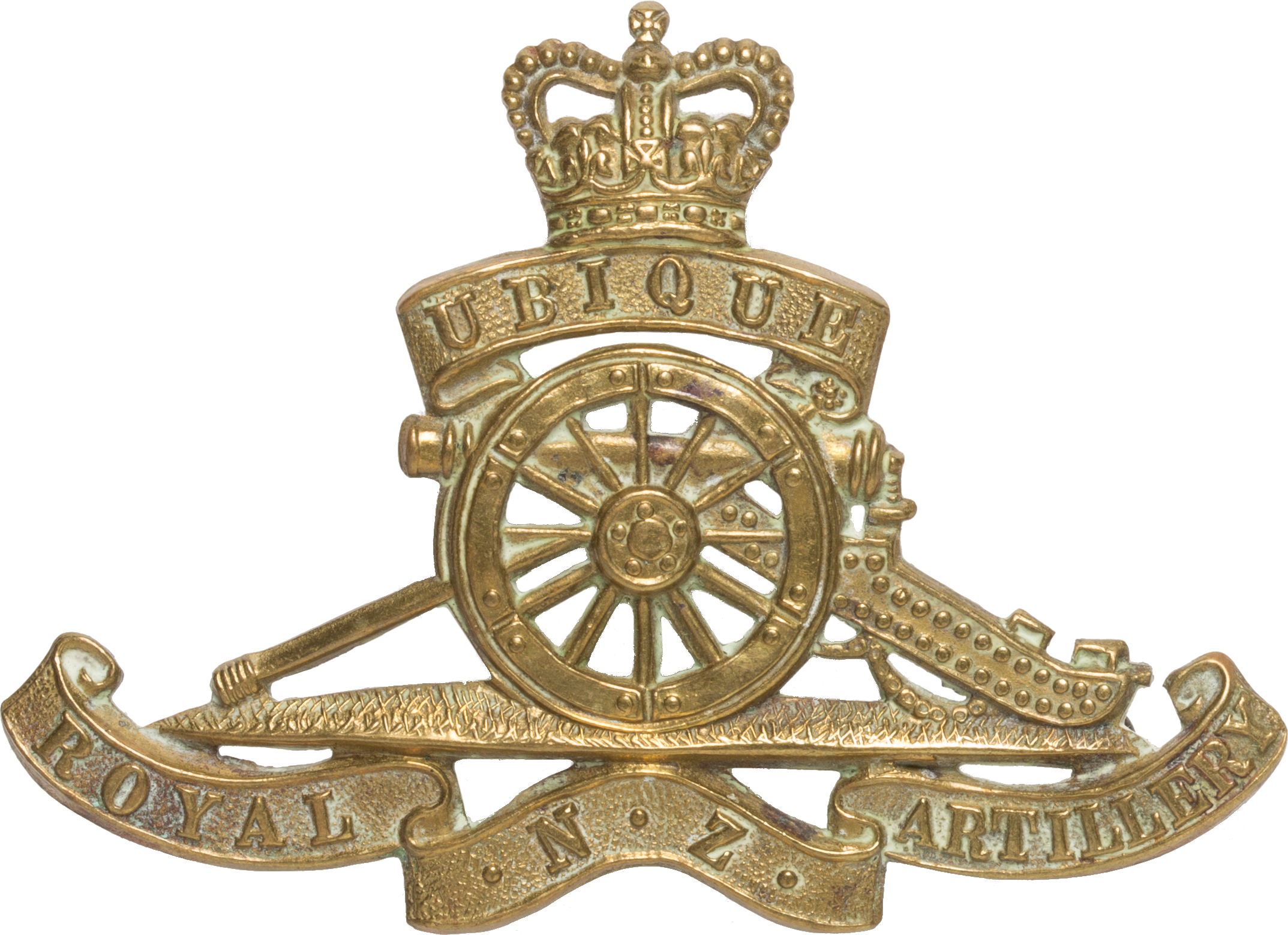
- Cap badge of the Royal New Zealand Artillery
- Active: 1940–1967
- Country: New Zealand
- Branch: New Zealand Army
- Type: Coastal Artillery
- Garrison/HQ: Wellington

The 10th Coast Regiment, Royal New Zealand Artillery was a territorial coastal artillery regiment of the New Zealand Army. The regiment was formed in 1940 as 10th Heavy Regiment, New Zealand Artillery and controlled the coastal defence batteries around Wellington Harbour. The regiment was progressively expanded and by the end of the war had batteries all over the lower North Island. The regiment was reduced to a cadre in 1957 and disbanded in 1967, along with the other coastal artillery regiments (9th and 11th).

== History ==
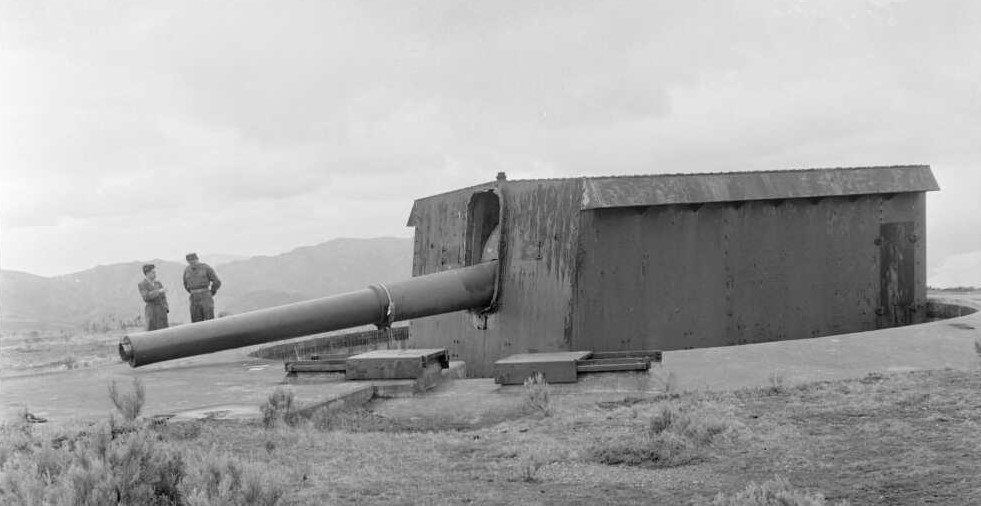
One of the 9.2 inch guns at Wrights hill operated by the regiment, 1957

Since the First World War, the coastal defences of Wellington had come under a single battery, 15 Heavy Battery (15 Coast Battery prior to 1934). In March 1940, 15 Heavy Battery was broken up into three batteries and the overall force increased in manpower. The 10th Heavy Regiment was formed in July 1940 to command the Wellington defence batteries, which included both coastal artillery and anti-aircraft artillery. In 1941, the regiment was expanded to include the coastal artillery batteries which covered other ports in the lower North Island. At its peak size in 1943, the regiment consisted of eight batteries in nine locations:

- 70 Battery (Palmer Head: three 6" Mk XXI)
- 71 Battery (Fort Dorset: two 6" Mk VII, two 4" Mk VII and four 12-pounder guns)
- 72 Battery (Fort Ballance: two 4" Mk VII, one twin 6-pounder and two 75 mm guns)
- 73 Battery (Opau, two 6" Mk VII guns)
- 77 Battery (Napier: two 6" Mk VII and four 40 mm Bofors. Gisborne: one 5" Mk VIII gun)
- 78 Battery (New Plymouth, two 155 mm, four 40-mm Bofors
- 140 Battery (Wanganui: one 5" Mk VIII Gun
- 165 Battery (Wrights Hill, two 9.2" Mk XV guns)

The regiment name was changed to 10th Coast Regiment in October 1944 and in the same year, the coastal defences were effectively mothballed. After the war it was decided that only the defences at Wellington should be kept in an operational state by a small peacetime garrison. In 1948 the territorial force was reorganised. All the New Zealand Artillery became part of the Royal New Zealand Artillery and the batteries were renumbered as:

- 101 Battery (Fort Dorset)
- 102 Battery (Palmer Head)
- 103 Battery (Fort Ballance)
- 104 Battery (Wrights Hill and the twin 6-pounder at Fort Ballance)

It was decided in 1957 that the coastal artillery regiments were no longer necessary. The armament and equipment were placed on a care and maintenance basis, while the regiment was reduced to a cadre. Over the coming years, the equipment was scrapped and much of the facilities and land were sold off. The regiment eventually dropped to a single quartermaster sergeant, but continued to exist on paper until it was formally disbanded in 1967.

== Notes ==
Citations

References

- Cooke, Peter (2016). Defending New Zealand: Ramparts on the Seas 1840-1950s. Wellington: Defence of New Zealand Study Group. ISBN 978-0-473-06833-2.
- Cooke, Peter; Crawford, J. (2011). The Territorials. Auckland: Random House. ISBN 978-1-86979-446-0.
- Henderson, Alan; Green, David; Cooke, Peter D. F. (2008). The Gunners:A History of New Zealand Artillery. Auckland: Reed Publishing. ISBN 978-07900-1141-7.
- Cooke, Peter (2020). Wrights Hill: New Zealand's 9.2-inch Coast Defence Batteries. Wellington: Defence of New Zealand Study Group. ISBN 978-0-473-50506-6.
