= Wrights Hill Fortress =

Artillery battery in Karori, Wellington, New Zealand

Coordinates: 41.2961°S 174.739°E

- Near Wellington in New Zealand
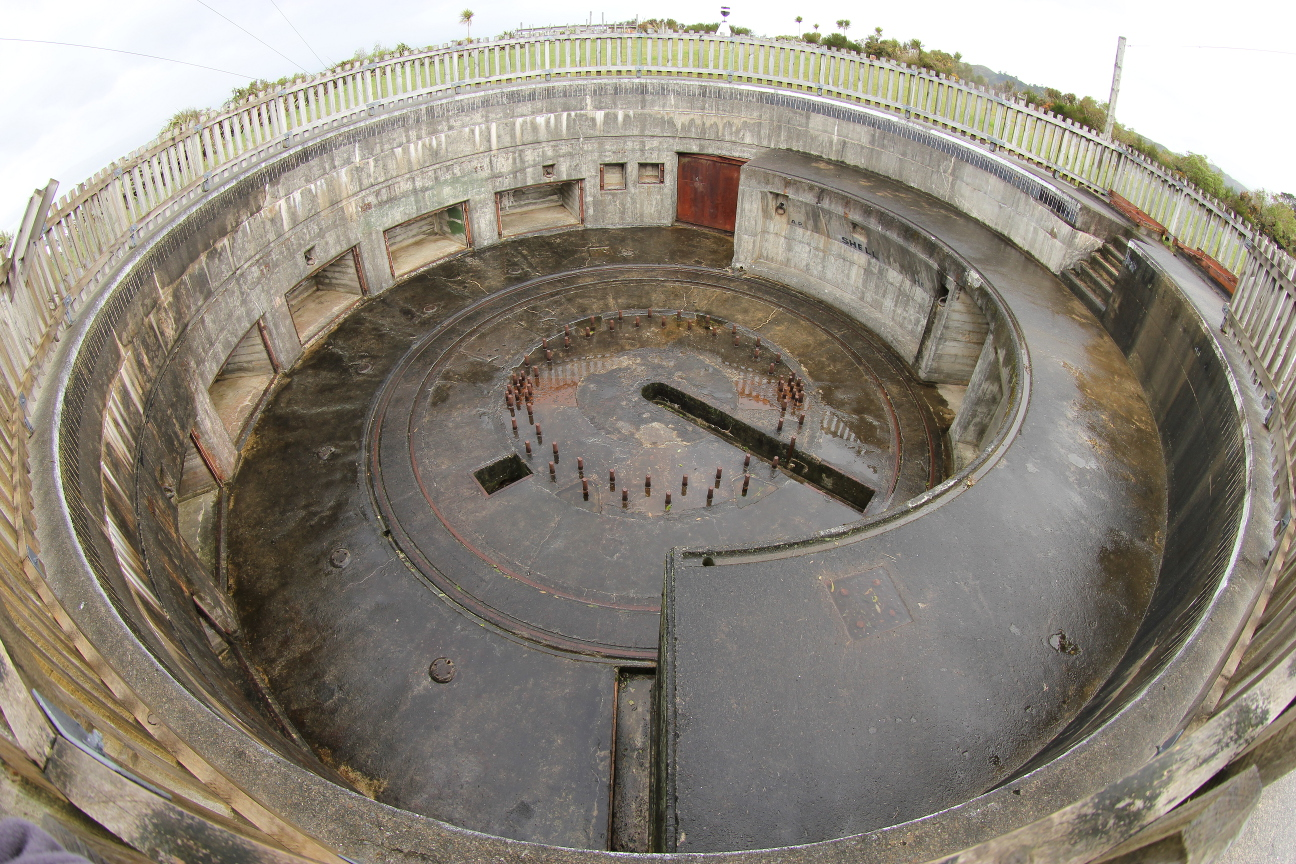
- The No.1 Gun Emplacement

Site information
- Type: Fortress
- Owner: New Zealand Department of Conservation
- Operator: Wright's Hill Fortress Restoration Society
- Open to the public: Yes
- Condition: Maintained by volunteers
- Website: https://wrightshillfortress.org.nz/

Site history
- Built: 1942-1944
- Built by: Downer & Co Ltd. Department of Public Works
- In use: 1944-1957
- Fate: Mainly intact, guns removed
- Events: Second World War

Heritage New Zealand – Category 1
- Designated: 25 June 2004
- Reference no.: 7543

Wrights Hill Fortress is a counter bombardment coastal artillery battery in the Karori suburb of Wellington, New Zealand. It was built between 1942 and 1944 and is predominantly underground, with numerous tunnels linking the war shelters, gun emplacements, magazines, plotting rooms and engine room – which are, at some points, over 50 feet underground. The fort was intended to house three 9.2" Mk. XV guns, but only two guns were installed and the fort never saw action. After World War II was over, fort commanders fired both of the guns (Gun number one in 1946 and the second in 1947). The fall of the shot was observed in Cook Strait and these test firings (three rounds on each occasion) were deemed a success. In 1960, both of the guns were sold to Japanese companies as scrap metal. The design of the fort is similar to the Stony Batter and Whangaparāoa 9.2" Mk. XV batteries, near Auckland.

Wrights Hill Fortress is currently in the hands of a preservation society and can be visited by the public. The Fortress is listed as a Category I Historic Place.

== History ==
=== Background ===
In response to the Russian scare of the 1880s, numerous coastal forts had been constructed around Wellington. These defenses were superseded in 1910 by a 6-inch Mk VII gun battery at Point Dorset, but were outdated by the 1930s. In 1933 the New Zealand Government instigated a modernisation program of the New Zealand Military Forces, which included the construction of new coastal defenses at Wellington. Under advice from the War Office in the United Kingdom, 9.2 inch guns were approved in 1934 and the Wrights Hill site selected. The anticipated cost of the proposed three-gun battery, however, proved to be too much and the decision was made to instead construct a smaller 6-inch gun battery at Palmer point. The idea of the 9.2-inch battery at Wrights Hill was revisited in 1937 and although approved by Cabinet, it was again delayed due to cost. Only with the outbreak of war in 1939 was the plan acted on, but the inability to acquire the guns meant that construction could not begin. In March 1942, the gun manufacturers provided an expected delivery date of within 12 months and construction could finally begin.

=== Construction ===
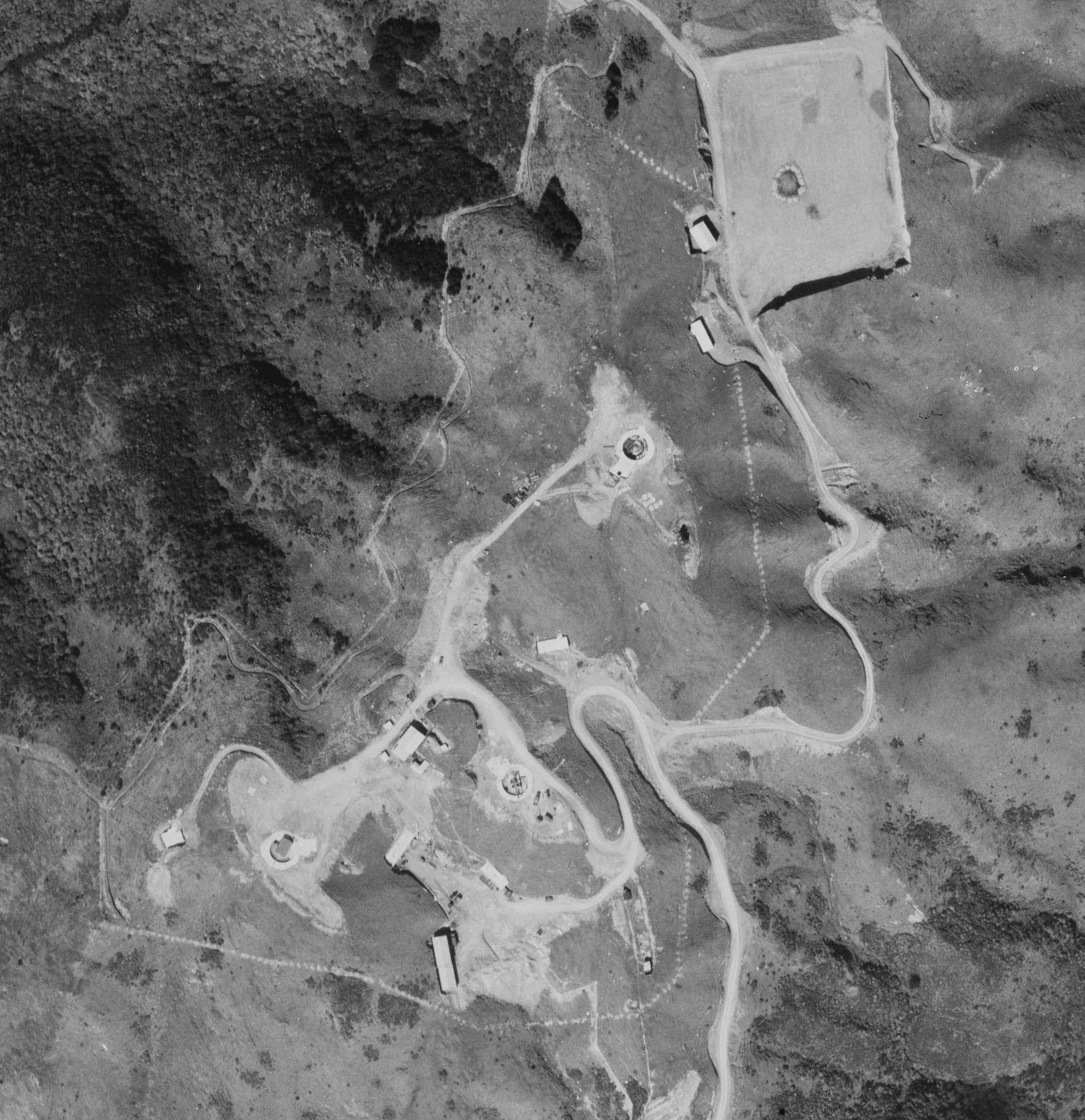
Aerial photograph of the fortress, September 1945

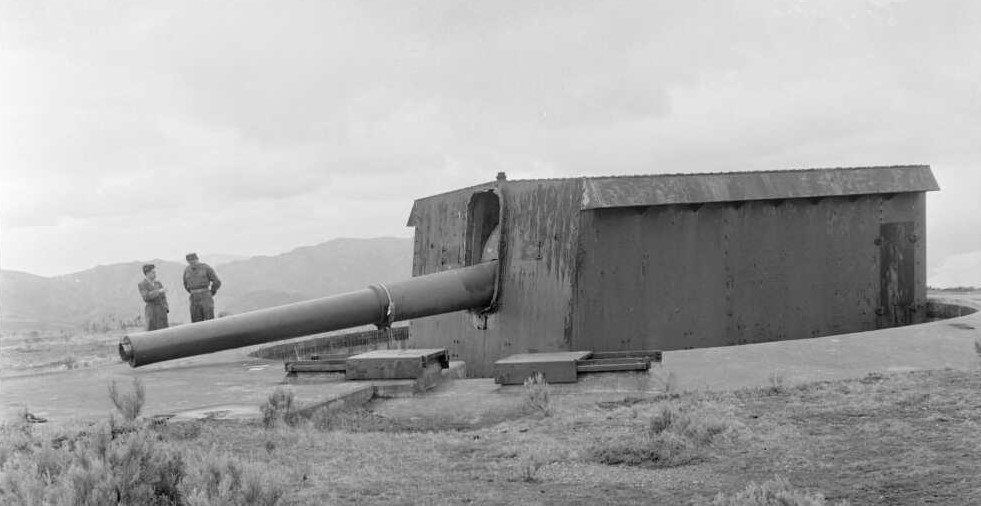
The No. 1 Gun in 1957

Surveying of the site was conducted in April 1942 and by September a camp for 160 workers had been constructed. Tunneling began in December, with construction initially conducted by Downer & Co Ltd. By late 1943 a manpower shortage meant that the Department of Public Works had to step in, providing men recently returned from the disbanded 3rd Division. As the strategic situation in the Pacific became more favorable and the threat of Japanese Invasion reduced, construction of the battery slowed. Due to a change in priorities and in an effort to reduce costs, the government decided in January 1944 to reduce the battery from three to two guns. The site was complete by June and the two remaining guns were installed by the end of 1944. The final cost of construction was £249,120, double the original estimate of £122,430.

=== Post War ===
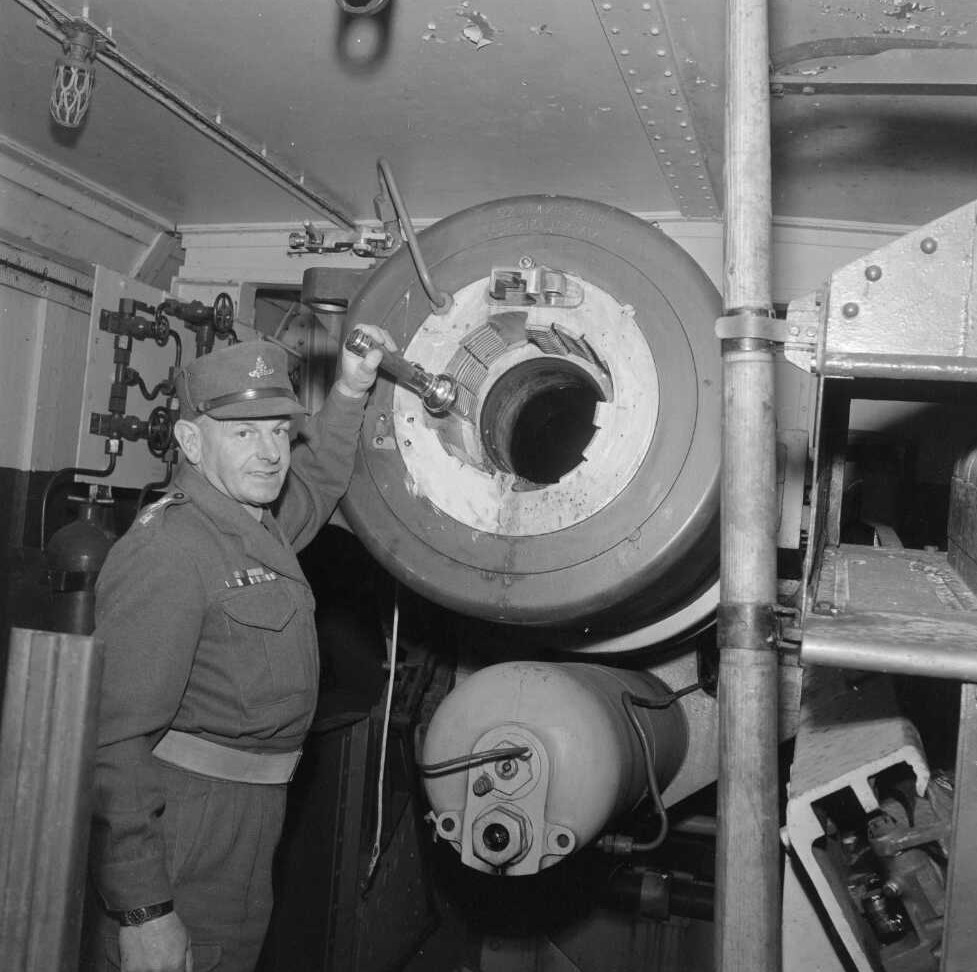
Interior of one of the gun turrets

After the war it became clear that the fortress would serve little purpose and only served as a training facility. The No. 1 gun was tested on 28 June 1946, firing three rounds into Cook Strait at ranges of 10,000; 22,500 and 30,000 yards. The report from the guns resulted in a total of nineteen windows being broken at the fortress. A further three windows were broken and a plaster ceiling cracked in residential properties near the fortress on Verveirs Street and were repaired by the Public Works Department. The No.2 gun was later tested on 26 March 1947, firing a further three shots. The fortress suffered eight more windows broken (those broken in the testing of the No.1 gun had been replaced with stronger glass and all survived the second test) and also had some of the internal wall and ceiling linings collapse. The test firings were both considered successes, and were the only shots ever fired by the fortress.

In 1953 the Army placed Wrights Hill Fortress on a "long term care and maintenance basis" and the fortress was sealed in a state of preservation. In 1957 the Coastal Artillery branch was reduced to a cadre status and effectively disbanded. The guns were initially sold for scrap to the Sydney based company Bradman & Coin in 1960, but were ultimately sold on, ironically, to Japan. The gun pits were filled in in 1961 and the defence reserve status was lifted, although 10th Coast Regiment didn't fully relinquish control of the fortress until 1962. The site has since had various civil infrastructure projects built on it by organisations such as the Wellington Municipal Electricity Department, Wellington Water Board and the Civil Aviation Authority. The New Zealand Post and Telegraph Department (later Telecom/Spark) has also used the site to set up telecommunication aerials since 1955, and continued to store equipment in some of the war shelters until 1997.

== Restoration ==
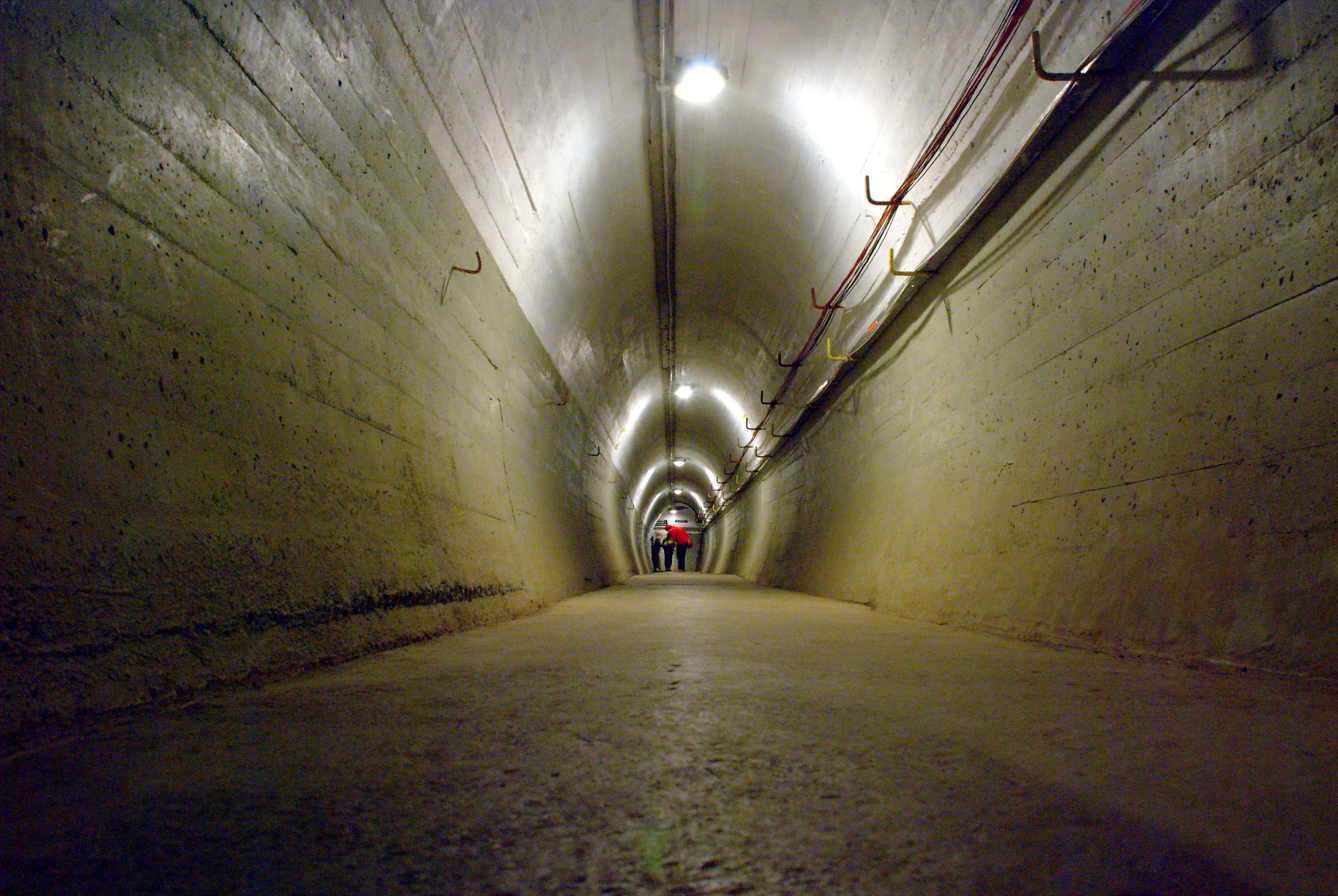
Inside the restored fortress tunnels

The Karori Lions Club began restorations in 1988 and opened the fortress to the public for the first time on ANZAC Day 1989. The Wrights Hill Fortress Restoration Society was subsequently formed in 1992 and continue to maintain and restore the fortress. The no.1 gun pit is now completely excavated and had the bearing markings repainted, while the underground tunnel network has had the drainage system repaired and lighting installed. In 2004 the fortress was identified by Heritage New Zealand as "one of New Zealand's most significant or best representative examples of coastal defence" and listed as a Category I Historic Place. The status of the site was changed in 2019 from a recreational reserve to a historic reserve.

== Characteristics ==
The fortress was based on British designs and consists of 620 m of tunnel work connecting the three gun pits and associated magazines, engine rooms, plotting rooms and other infrastructure. The tunnel walls are lined with 250 mm of concrete and only reinforced at end walls. During construction approximately 9,333 m^{3} of spoil was excavated and 2,900 m^{3} of concrete poured. The 9.2-inch Mk XV guns each weighed 135 tons and could fire a 172 kg shell to a maximum range of 30 km. Two 185 horsepower Ruston & Hornsby diesel generators provided the power necessary to lay the guns.

The fortress was manned by 165 Battery of the 10th Coast Regiment, Royal New Zealand Artillery (later retitled 104 Battery). The theoretical strength necessary to fully operate the fortress was 195 personnel (132 men from the Territorial Force and 63 women from the Women's Auxiliary Army Corps), however the battery never exceeded a strength of more than 20 personnel. Had the third gun been installed, a total of 248 personnel would have been necessary.

== In popular culture ==
The Fellowship of the Ring sound designers used the tunnels to record echo effects for the Mines of Moria sequence.

The New Zealand horror film The Devil's Rock was filmed in the tunnels and gun pits, standing in for a World War II German bunker.

== See also ==
- Coastal fortifications of New Zealand
- Stony Batter
