= 12th Heavy Anti-Aircraft Regiment, Royal New Zealand Artillery =

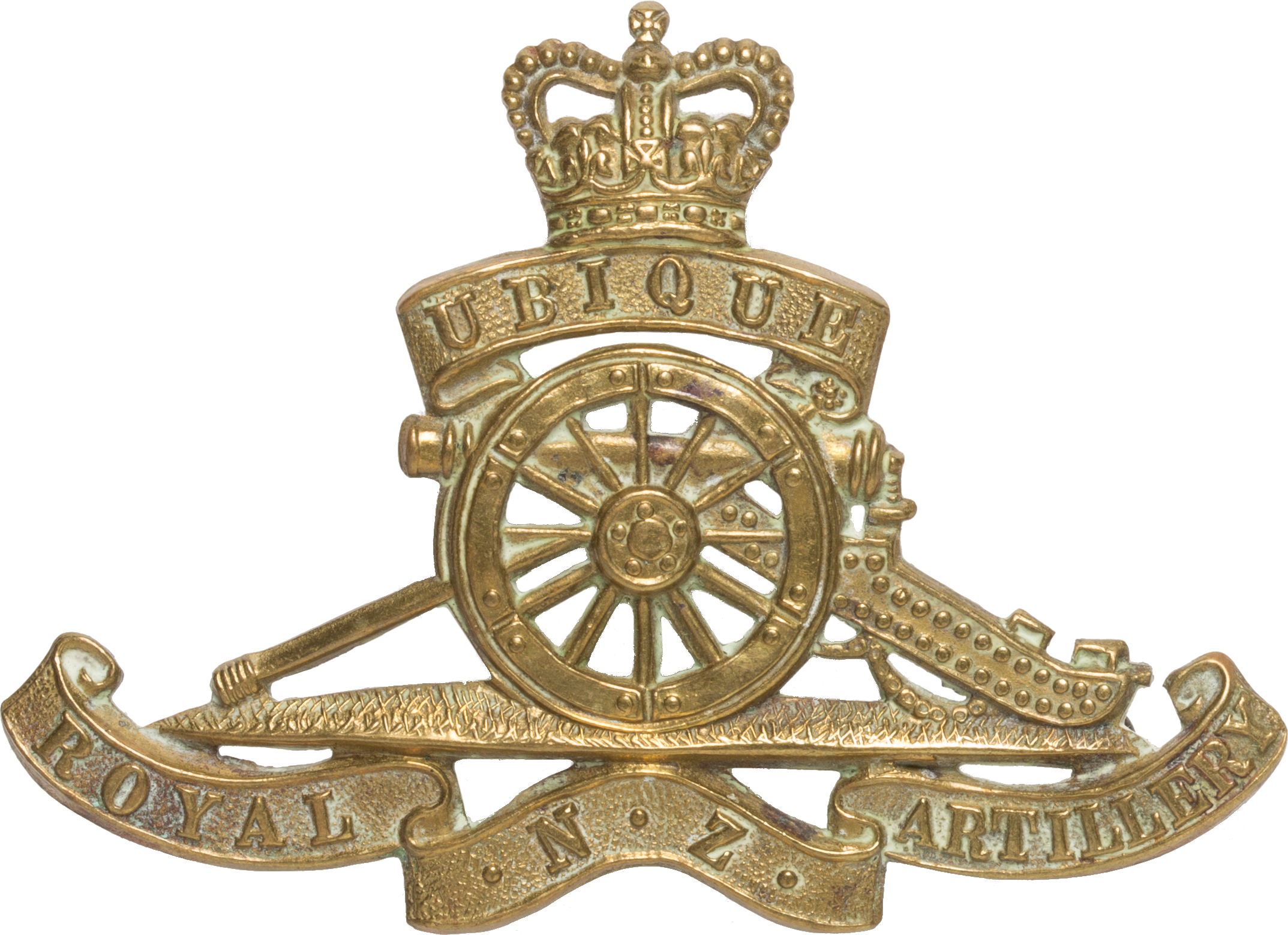
- Cap badge of the Royal New Zealand Artillery
- Active: 1956–1961
- Country: New Zealand
- Branch: New Zealand Army
- Type: Air Defence

The 12th Heavy Anti-Aircraft Regiment, Royal New Zealand Artillery was a territorial air defence regiment of the New Zealand Army. It was formed in 1956 from the heavy batteries of the 13th and 14th Composite Anti-Aircraft Regiments, based in Auckland and Wellington respectively, as well as an independent battery based in Christchurch (formerly of 15th Composite Anti-Aircraft Regiments which had been disbanded in 1954). The 12th Heavy Anti-Aircraft regiment was disbanded in 1961.
