= 6th Light Anti-Aircraft Regiment, Royal New Zealand Artillery =

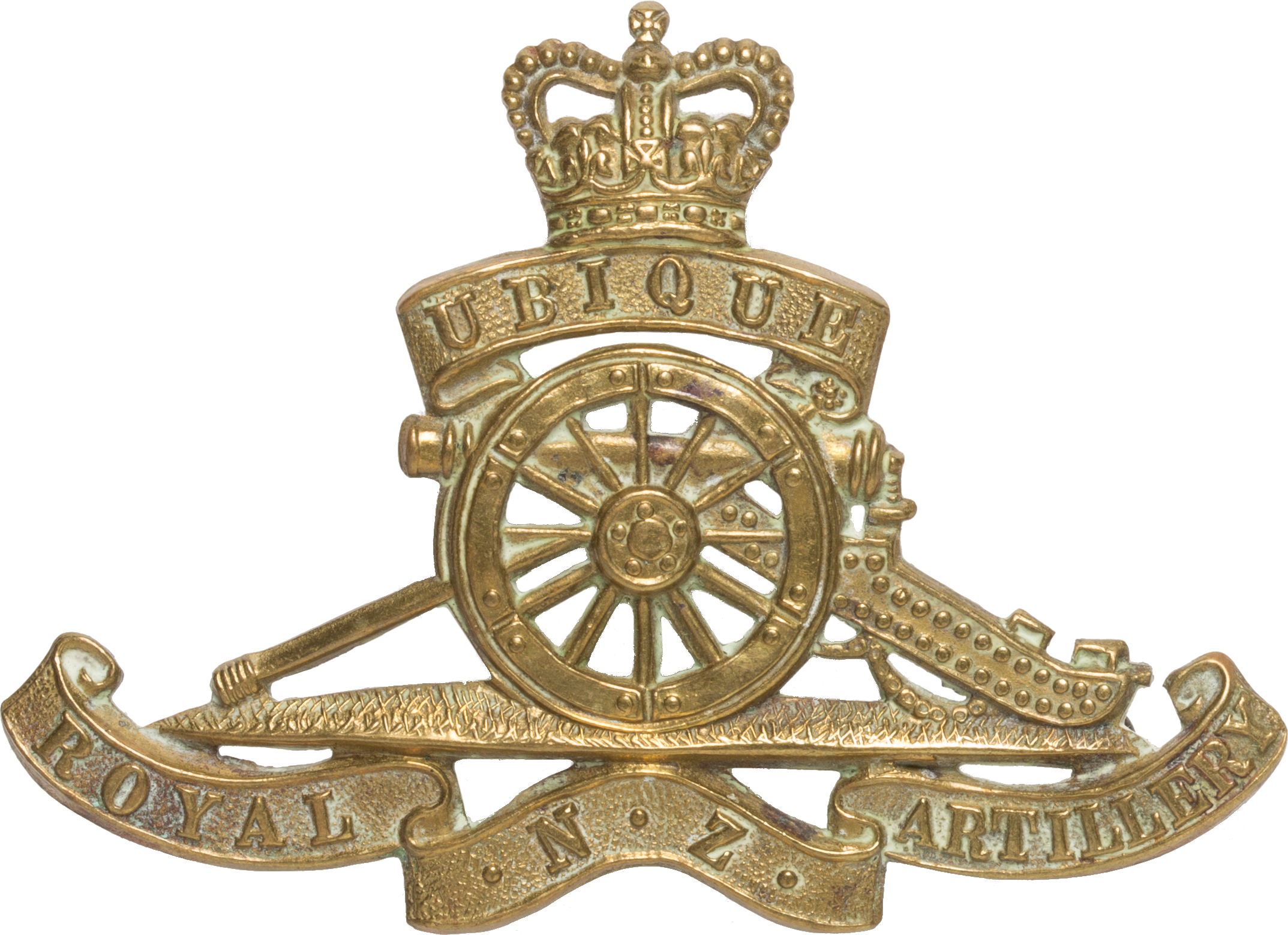
- Cap badge of the Royal New Zealand Artillery
- Active: 1948-1961
- Country: New Zealand
- Branch: New Zealand Army
- Type: Air Defence

The 6th Light Anti-Aircraft Regiment, Royal New Zealand Artillery was a territorial air defence regiment of the New Zealand Army. It was formed in 1948 and equipped with 40mm Bofors anti-aircraft guns. The regiment was disbanded in 1961.
