= 11th Coast Regiment, Royal New Zealand Artillery =

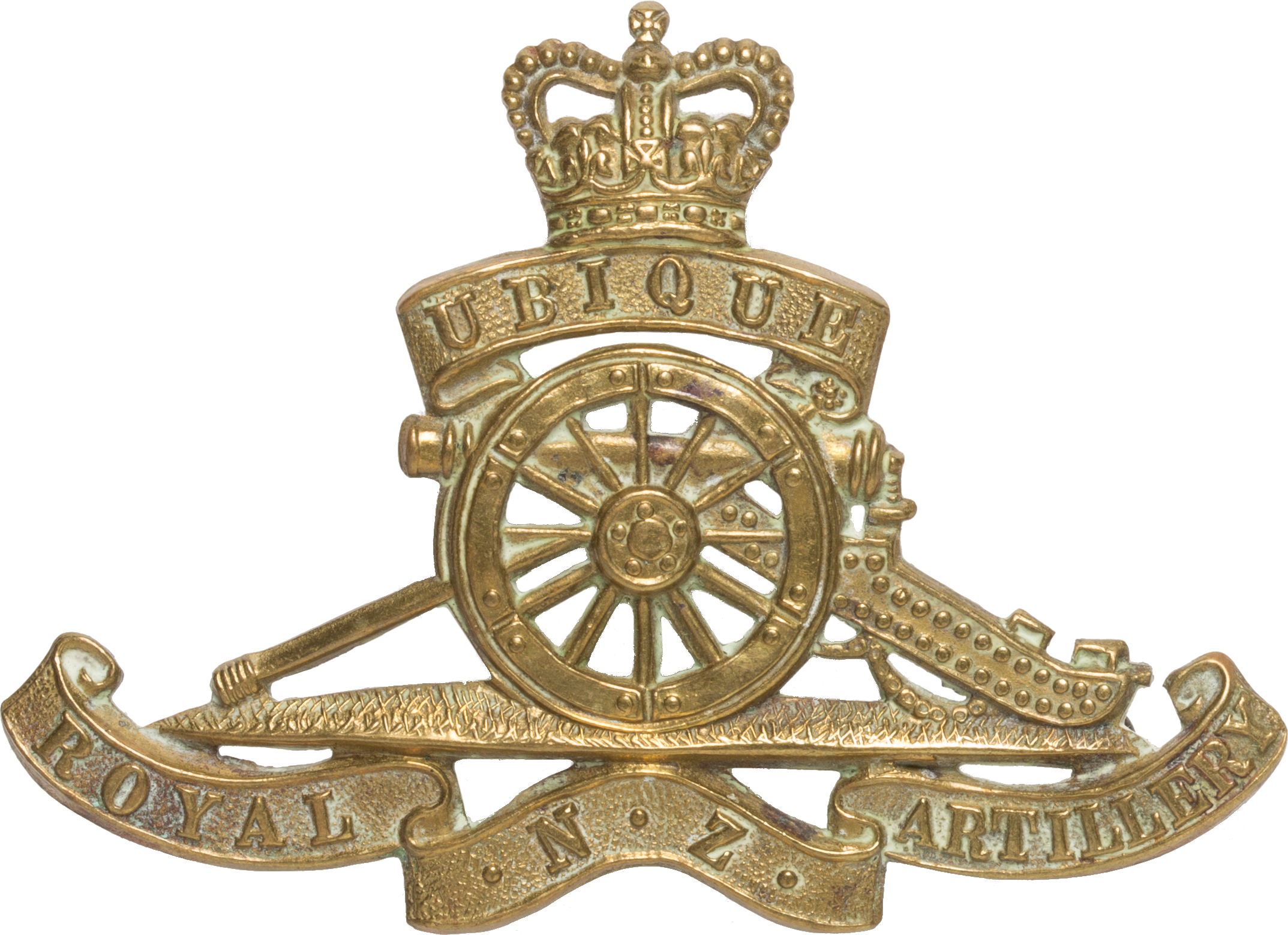
- Cap badge of the Royal New Zealand Artillery
- Active: 1940-1967
- Country: New Zealand
- Branch: Army
- Type: Artillery
- Role: Coastal Artillery
- Size: One regiment
- Part of: Royal Regiment of New Zealand Artillery
- Garrison/HQ: Godley Head
- Motto(s): Ubique (Everywhere) (Latin)
- March: Quick — The Right of the Line; Slow — The Duchess of Kent

Commanders
- Captain General: HM The Queen

The 11th Coast Regiment, Royal New Zealand Artillery was a territorial coastal artillery regiment of the New Zealand Army based at Godley Head. The regiment was formed in 1940 as 11th Heavy Regiment, New Zealand Artillery and controlled the coastal defence batteries around Lyttelton Harbour. The regiment was progressively expanded and by the end of the war had batteries all over the upper North Island. The regiment was reduced to a cadre in 1957 and disbanded in 1967, along with the other coastal artillery regiments (9th and 10th).

== History ==
Since the First World War, the coastal defences of Lyttelton had come under a single battery, 23 Heavy Battery (23 Coast Battery prior to 1934). In March 1940, 23 Heavy Battery was broken up into three batteries and the overall force increased in manpower. The 11th Heavy Regiment was formed in July 1940 to command the Lyttelton defence batteries, which included both coastal artillery and anti-aircraft artillery. In 1941, the regiment was expanded to include the coastal artillery batteries which covered other ports in the South Island, however in May 1943, 82, 141 and 142 batteries were detached and become 13th Coast Regiment. These batteries returned in December when 13th Coast Regiment was disbanded. At its peak size in 1943, the regiment consisted of nine batteries:

- 80 Battery (Godley Head: three 6" Mk XXIV guns)
- 81 Battery (Battery Point: two 4" Mk VII guns and one twin 6-pounder guns; Ripapa Island: one 6" EOC gun)
- 82 Battery (Taiaroa Head: one 6" EOC gun; Rerewahine: two 6" Mk VII guns; Tomahawk Beach: two 6" Mk VII guns; Harrington Point: two twin 6-pounder guns and two 6-pounder guns)
- 84 Battery (Tory Channel: one 6" Mk VII and twelve 40 mm Bofors guns; Maraetai Bay: one 6" Mk VII; Blumine Island: two 6" Mk VII guns; Post Office Point: one 6" Mk VII gun; Maud Island: one 6" Mk VII gun; Nelson: (one 6" Mk VII gun)
- 85 Battery (Timaru: two 6" Mk 7 and four 40 mm Bofors guns)
- 134 Battery (Westport: one 5" Mk VIII and four 40 mm Bofors guns; Greymouth: one 5" Mk VIII and four 40 mm Bofors guns)
- 143 Battery (Akaroa: two 6" Mk VII and four 40 mm Bofors guns)
- 141 Battery (Oamaru: one 5" Mk VIII gun)
- 142 Battery (Bluff: 6" Mk VII gun)

The name of the regiment was changed to 11th Coast Regiment in October 1944 and in the same year, the coastal defences were effectively mothballed. After the war it was decided that only the defences at Lyttelton should be kept in an operational state by a small peacetime garrison. In 1948 the territorial force was reorganised. All the New Zealand Artillery became part of the Royal New Zealand Artillery and the batteries were renumbered as:

- 111 Battery (Battery Point)
- 112 Battery (Godley Point)
- 113 Battery (Battery Point)

It was decided in 1957 that the coastal artillery regiments were no longer necessary. The armament and equipment were placed on a care and maintenance basis, while the regiment was reduced to a cadre. Over the coming years, the equipment was scrapped and much of the facilities and land were sold off. The regiment eventually dropped to a single quartermaster sergeant, but continued to exist on paper until it was formally disbanded in 1967.

== Affiliations ==
- United Kingdom — Royal Artillery
- Canada — Royal Canadian Artillery
- Australia — Royal Australian Artillery

== Notes ==
Citations

References

- Cooke, Peter (2016). Defending New Zealand: Ramparts on the Seas 1840-1950s. Wellington: Defence of New Zealand Study Group. ISBN 0-473-06833-8.
- Cooke, Peter; Crawford, J. (2011). The Territorials. Auckland: Random House. ISBN 978-1-86979-446-0.
- Henderson, Alan; Green, David; Cooke, Peter D. F. (2008). The Gunners: A History of New Zealand Artillery. Auckland: Reed Publishing. ISBN 978-07900-1141-7.
- Cooke, Peter (2020). Wrights Hill: New Zealand's 9.2-inch Coast Defence Batteries. Wellington: Defence of New Zealand Study Group. ISBN 978-0-473-50506-6.
