= John Spencer (businessman) =

New Zealand business magnate

John Berridge Spencer (1934 or 1935 – 10 February 2016) was a New Zealand business magnate.

Spencer was for many years head of Caxton Pulp & Paper, a business founded in 1890 by his grandfather, Albert Spencer. He inherited the company in 1981 from his father, Berridge Spencer, who had successfully expanded the company after World War I. Expansion included the founding of the pulp and paper mill at Kawerau. John Spencer ran the company until 1988, when he sold it to Carter Holt Harvey for a sum estimated at $NZ 300 million.

During the stock market boom of the 1980s, Spencer's nett wealth was estimated at $675 million, making him New Zealand's richest man. Other business interests included property and vineyards. He lost heavily in the 1987 stock market crash, but managed to retain a significant portion of his fortune, which was augmented by the Caxton sale. By 2015, the NBR rich list estimated that the Spencer family fortune was around $720 million.

In the last years of his life, Spencer was as well known for disputes over land access on his Waiheke Island property as for his fortune. An intensely private man, he waged a two decade-long campaign to reduce public access to the Stony Batter historic site on his farm, a dispute which involved him on one occasion barricading a public road. The dispute eventually ended up at the Privy Council, with Spencer losing the case.

Spencer died in London on 10 February 2016 at the age of 81. His wife, Finnish-born Tytti Laurola, predeceased him, dying of cancer in 1992 at the age of 54. He was survived by his son Berridge and daughter Mertsi.
