= 14th Composite Anti-Aircraft Regiment, Royal New Zealand Artillery =

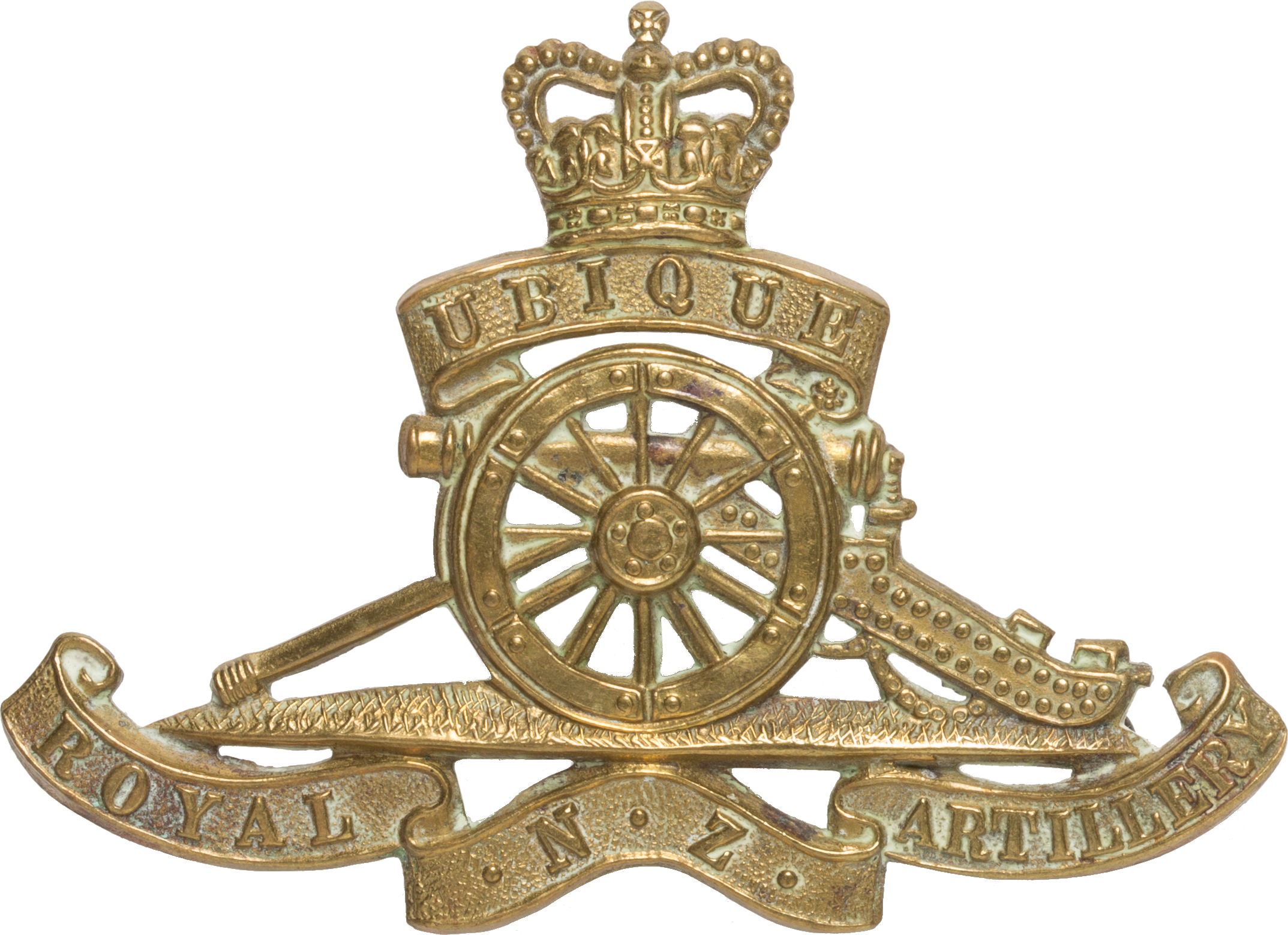
- Cap badge of the Royal New Zealand Artillery
- Active: 1948–1956
- Country: New Zealand
- Branch: New Zealand Army
- Type: Air Defence

The 14th Composite Anti-Aircraft Regiment, Royal New Zealand Artillery was a territorial air defence regiment of the New Zealand Army. The regiment was formed in 1948 and disbanded in 1956, with its heavy battery being transferred to the newly formed 12th Heavy Anti-Aircraft Regiment.
