= 4th Medium Regiment, Royal New Zealand Artillery =

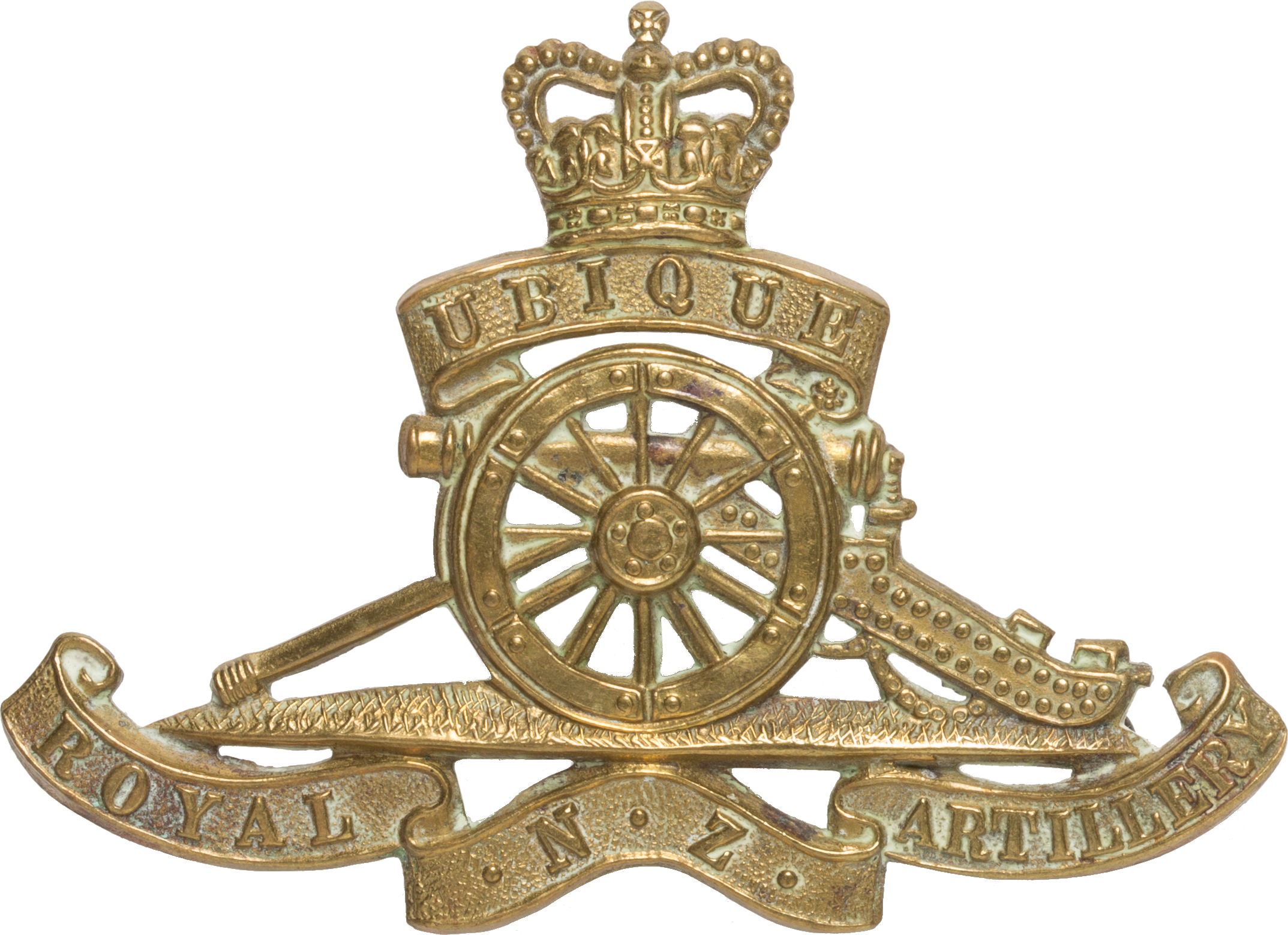
- Cap badge of the Royal New Zealand Artillery
- Active: 1948–1961
- Country: New Zealand
- Branch: New Zealand Army
- Type: Artillery
- Garrison/HQ: Hamilton, New Zealand

The 4th Medium Regiment, Royal New Zealand Artillery was a territorial artillery regiment of the New Zealand Army based in the Waikato. It was formed in 1948 and initially equipped with 6 inch howitzers, although these were replaced with 5.5 inch guns in 1951. The regiment received the freedom of the city of Hamilton, New Zealand in 1960 and bore the city's coat of arms on their guns. The regiment was disbanded in 1961.
