= Royal Regiment of New Zealand Artillery =

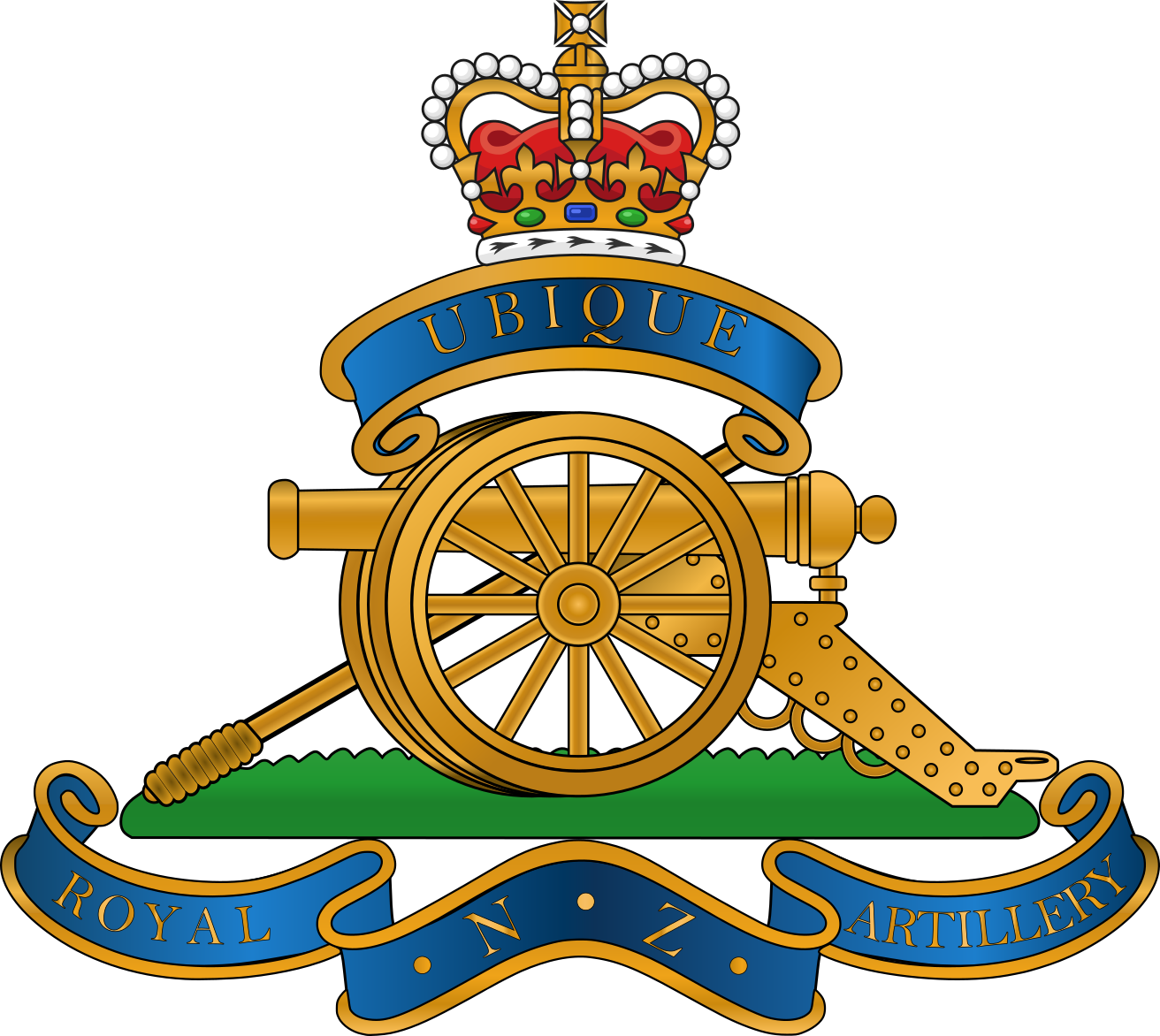
- Cap badge of the Royal Regiment of New Zealand Artillery
- Active: 15 October 1902 – present
- Country: New Zealand
- Branch: New Zealand Army
- Type: Artillery
- Role: Field Artillery/Low Level Air Defence
- Garrison/HQ: Linton
- Motto: Ubique (Everywhere) (Latin)
- March: Quick – The Right of the Line; March Past – British Grenadiers; Slow – The Duchess of Kent
- Engagements: Korean War: Battle of Kapyong; Vietnam War: Battle of Long Tan; Battle of Coral-Balmoral

Commanders
- Captain General: King Charles III

Insignia
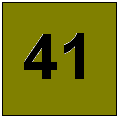
- Tac-Sign

The Royal Regiment of New Zealand Artillery is the artillery regiment of the New Zealand Army. It is effectively a military administrative corps, and can comprise multiple component regiments. This nomenclature stems from its heritage as an offshoot of the British Army's Royal Artillery. In its current form it was founded in 1947 with the amalgamation of the regular and volunteer corps of artillery in New Zealand. In 1958 in recognition of services rendered it was given the title the Royal Regiment of New Zealand Artillery.

== History ==
=== Predecessors and formation ===
The Royal Regiment of New Zealand Artillery's predecessor units in the Volunteer Force date from February 1866, when the first field artillery battery and naval artillery corps were formed. From 1878 the various field batteries were administratively grouped together as the New Zealand Regiment of Artillery Volunteers, and were designated alphabetically. The naval artillery batteries were grouped as the New Zealand Garrison Artillery Volunteers in 1902. Meanwhile, the establishment of coast defences from the mid-1880s had necessitated the creation of a small permanent artillery force within the Permanent Military, which was designated the Royal New Zealand Artillery (RNZA) on 15 October 1902. Following the formation of the Territorial Force in 1911 the Regiment of New Zealand Field Artillery and the New Zealand Garrison Artillery Volunteers became part of the New Zealand Artillery. During this time the permanent RNZA maintained an instructional and cadre role.

Between 2–5 August 1914 pre-war plans to establish harbour examination batteries and mobilise the then Royal New Zealand Artillery (active force) and New Zealand Garrison Artillery (territorials) were carried out. The examination batteries' task was to interrogate unidentified vessels entering port. The examination batteries at Fort Takapuna, Point Gordon in Wellington, Fort Jervois and Howlett Point at the entrance to Port Chalmers were manned around the clock until 15 March 1915. After that date guns and equipment were maintained at a high state of readiness, with battery personnel available at a few hours' notice.' During initial mobilisation for the First World War, it was intended that one six-gun 18-pounder battery would form part of the initial contingent of the New Zealand Expeditionary Force. Following large numbers volunteering for artillery, it was decided to raise the a brigade of three batteries, totalling twelve 18-pounders. The initial brigade departed with the rest of the Main Body on 16 October 1914. Eventually two New Zealand field artillery brigades (regiment-sized units) served with the New Zealand and Australian Division. Following the end of the war the New Zealand Artillery was renamed the Regiment of New Zealand Artillery.

During the Second World War, 4, 5 and 6 Field Regiments sailed with the 2nd New Zealand Expeditionary Force; initially also despatched was 7 Anti-Tank Regiment and 14 Light Anti-Aircraft Regiment. A number of artillery regiments and batteries served with the 2nd New Zealand Expeditionary Force in the Pacific (2 NZEF IP), and 3rd Division. After the war ended, the Territorial Force was reconstituted in the late 1940s, and a number of field, mortar (5th Light Regiment RNZA), and coastal units were created. In January 1947 the Regiment of New Zealand Artillery was amalgamated with the RNZA.

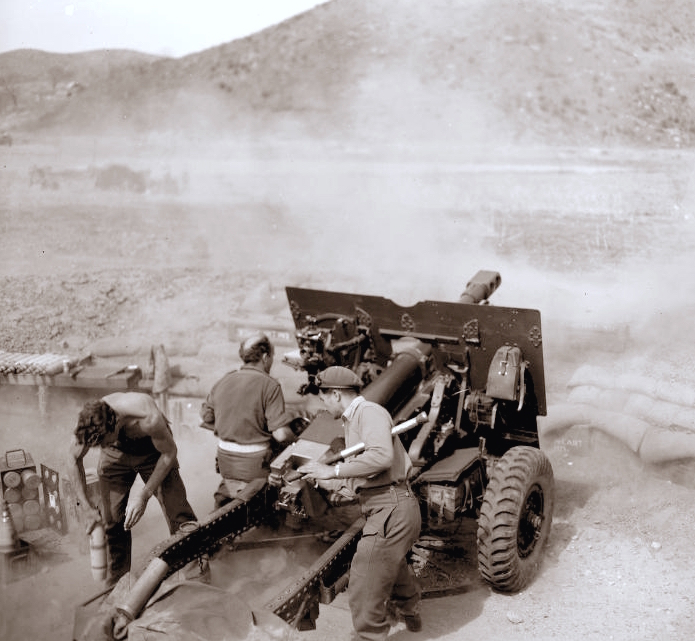
New Zealand gunners in action in Korea, April 1952

=== Korean War ===
When the Korean War broke out in June 1950, a Regular Force regiment, 16th Field Regiment RNZA, was established as the core of New Zealand's deployed contingent, known as Kayforce, in January 1951. The 5th Anti-Tank Regiment was disbanded during this time, in 1950. The battery was attached to the 27th British Brigade of the 1st Commonwealth Division. The 16th Field Regiment first saw action a month later and remained on active service for the next two and a half years. The 16th Field Regiment subsequently provided close support to the British Commonwealth infantry and was later awarded the South Korean Presidential Unit Citation for its actions during the Battle of Kapyong in April 1951. Between 1951 and 1953 the regiment fired more than 750,000 shells, operating 25-pounders. After the Armistice was signed in 1954, Kayforce’s numbers were gradually reduced. The 16th Field Regiment and other Corps elements were withdrawn in 1955. The last elements of Kayforce returned to New Zealand in 1957.

=== 1950s ===
In 1955, the regiment consisted of the following units:

- District Troops
  - Northern Military District
    - 9th Coast Regiment (Auckland)
    - 13th Composite Anti-aircraft Regiment
  - Central Military District
    - 10th Coast Regiment (Wellington)
    - 14th Composite Anti-aircraft Regiment
  - Southern Military District
    - 11th Coast Regiment (Lyttelton Respectively)
    - 151st Composite Anti-aircraft Battery RNZA (15th Composite AA Regiment disbanded Sept 1954)
- Divisional Troops
  - Headquarters Royal Artillery
    - Command
    - Royal Artillery Staff Troop
    - Divisional Counter Bombardment Staff Troop
  - 1st Field Regiment (Auckland)
  - 2nd Field Regiment (Palmerston North)
  - 3rd Field Regiment (Dunedin)
  - 4th Medium Regiment (Hamilton)
  - 5th Light Regiment (Wellington)
  - 6th Light Anti-aircraft Regiment (Auckland)
  - 12th Heavy Anti-aircraft Regiment (HQ Auckland)
  - 1st Locating Battery

The 1957 National Government defence review directed the discontinuation of coastal defence training, and the approximately 1000 personnel of the 9th, 10th, and 11th Coastal Regiments had their Compulsory Military Training obligation removed. A small cadre of regulars remained, but as Henderson, Green, and Cook say, 'the coastal artillery had quietly died.' All the fixed guns were dismantled and sold for scrap by the early 1960s. The three regiments survived on paper until 1967, 'each in its final years at an actual strength of a single warrant officer, the District Gunner, whose duties mainly involved taking care of the mobile 3.7-inch guns allocated for emergency harbour defences.'

In 1958 the regiment was redesignated the Royal Regiment of New Zealand Artillery. The 16th Field Regiment RNZA was reformed at this time as part of the Regular Force Brigade Group. In 1961 the last two anti-aircraft regiments were disbanded. Meanwhile, from 1963 Italian designed 105-mm L5 Pack Howitzers began replacing the 25-pounders. 5th Light Regiment RNZA was disbanded in 1964.

=== Vietnam War ===
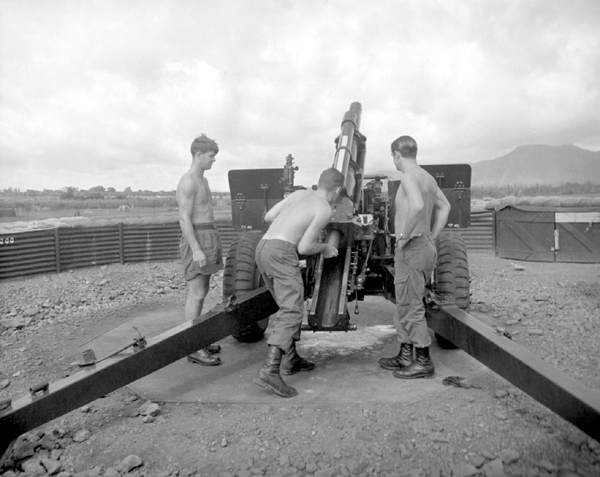
Gunners from 161 Bty RNZA carry out a fire mission. Vietnam, circa 1965/66

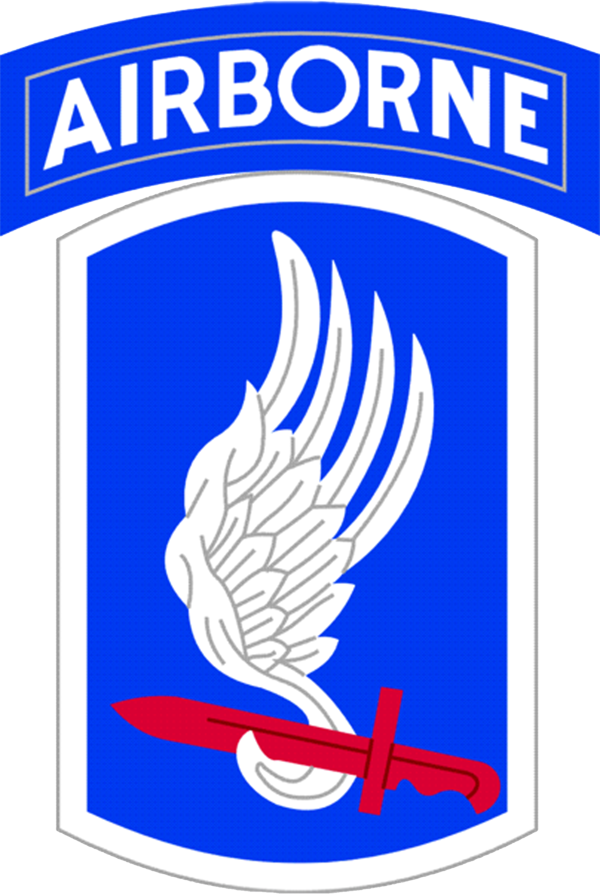
Insignia of the US 173rd Airborne Brigade. NZ gunners who served in 161 Bty, while under the 173rd (1965–1966) were permitted to wear the patch on their left sleeve.

A rotational RNZA battery was deployed to South Vietnam during the Vietnam War.

In 1965 the United States government committed its 173rd Airborne Brigade to South Vietnam in a combat role. Being part of the ANZUS pact Australia and New Zealand were asked to contribute military forces as well. Up until this time the Australians had committed an Army training team and New Zealand had committed some non-combatant engineers.

In response to the United States' request, the Australian government committed an infantry battalion and New Zealand committed an artillery battery. 161 Field Battery, RNZA arrived in South Vietnam on 16 July 1965. The Australian infantry regiment and the New Zealand artillery battery served under operational control of the 173rd Airborne, from the Bien Hoa Air Base in Biên Hòa Province. 161 Bty was attached as the third battery of the US 3rd Battalion, 319th Field Artillery Regiment. The battery began with base protection activities and Harassment and Interdiction (H&I) fire based on intelligence reports. By August the battery was deploying with Australian forces to support infantry operations, either by Australian armoured personnel carriers or by UH1B and the UH1D Iroquois helicopters.

The New Zealand battery and the Australian infantry battalion began their first major operation with the Americans on 14 September 1965 in Operation Ben Cat. Sergeant Alastair John Sherwood Don and Bombardier Robert White of 161 Bty were the first New Zealand casualties of the Vietnam War when the front of their vehicle was blown up by a Vietcong command detonated mine during the initial road convoy.

On operations New Zealand Forward Observers patrolled with U.S and Australian infantry to direct artillery fire when called upon.

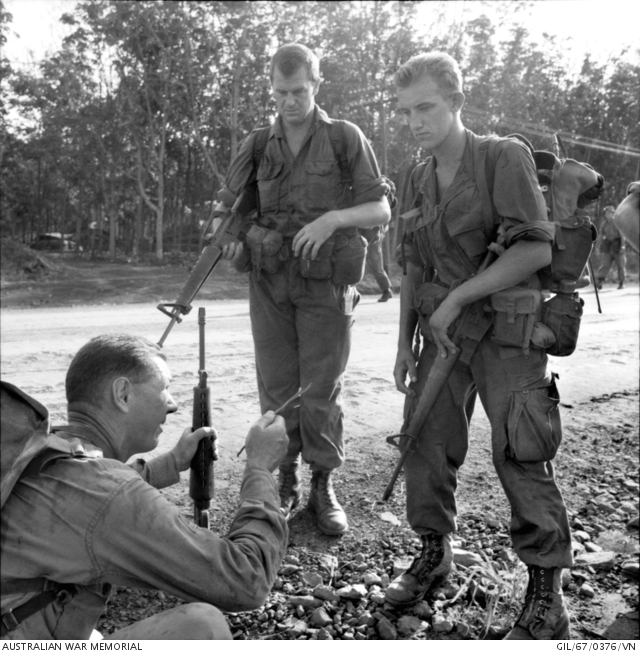
New Zealand Forward Observers with a Sergeant from 7RAR, Vietnam 1967

In their first year, under U.S command, the battery took part in:

- Operation Ben Cat (14-28 September 1965)
- Battle of Gang Toi during Operation Hump
- Operation New Life (15 November – 16 December 1965)
- Operation Marauder (1–8 January 1966)
- Operation Crimp (8–16 January 1966)
- Operation Entrée in general support of 1/503 US Infantry's operations,
- Battle of Suoi Bong Trang during Operation Rolling Stone in support of 1RAR,
- Operation Abilene in support of 1st US Infantry Division,
- Operation Denver as part of "Force Essex", and
- Operation Enoggera in support of newly arrived 6RAR.

In May 1966 it was decided to create an Australian task force with its own tactical area of responsibility (TAOR.) Phước Tuy Province was to be designated the TAOR for the new task force.

The 1st Australian Task Force (1ATF) was formed in June 1966, with a base built at Nui Dat. The New Zealand government was given the choice of allowing the artillery battery to remain at Bien Hoa under U.S command or integrate the battery with the new Australian task force. The decision was made to integrate the battery into 1ATF under 105 Battery, Royal Australian Artillery which had arrived at the end of September 1965.

In the 1991 movie documentary The Cu Chi Tunnels Vietcong survivors who hid in the Cu Chi tunnels during Operation Crimp said they called the artillery bombardments above them "The New Zealand Dong Dun Orchestra."

As part of 1ATF, the New Zealand battery is remembered well for its role in the Battle of Long Tan on 18 August 1966, during which it played a key role in supporting D Company, 6th Battalion, Royal Australian Regiment to hold off a regimental-sized Viet Cong force, despite being severely outnumbered. Three New Zealand artillery Forward Observers attached to D Company controlled the guns of their own battery, the two Australian batteries, and two American batteries – a total of 24 guns, in support of themselves and the rest of D Company for more than 3.5 hours. The FOs had the guns firing 6-8 rounds per minute almost non-stop.

In 1967 the battery's L5 howitzers were replaced by heavier and more robust American M2A2 Howitzers.

Also in 1967, the first company of New Zealand infantry arrived, followed by a second company in December 1967. The two infantry companies eventually amalgamated with one of the three 1ATF battalions in March 1968 to form the "ANZAC Battalion." This practice continued with each New Zealand infantry company rotating with or within 6 months of a new rotation of Australian infantry, designated "ANZAC Battalion" each time.

The battery would continue to support allied forces throughout its entire time in Vietnam, notably Operation Bribie in 1967, and Operation Coburg, the Tet Offensive and the Battle of Coral–Balmoral in 1968.

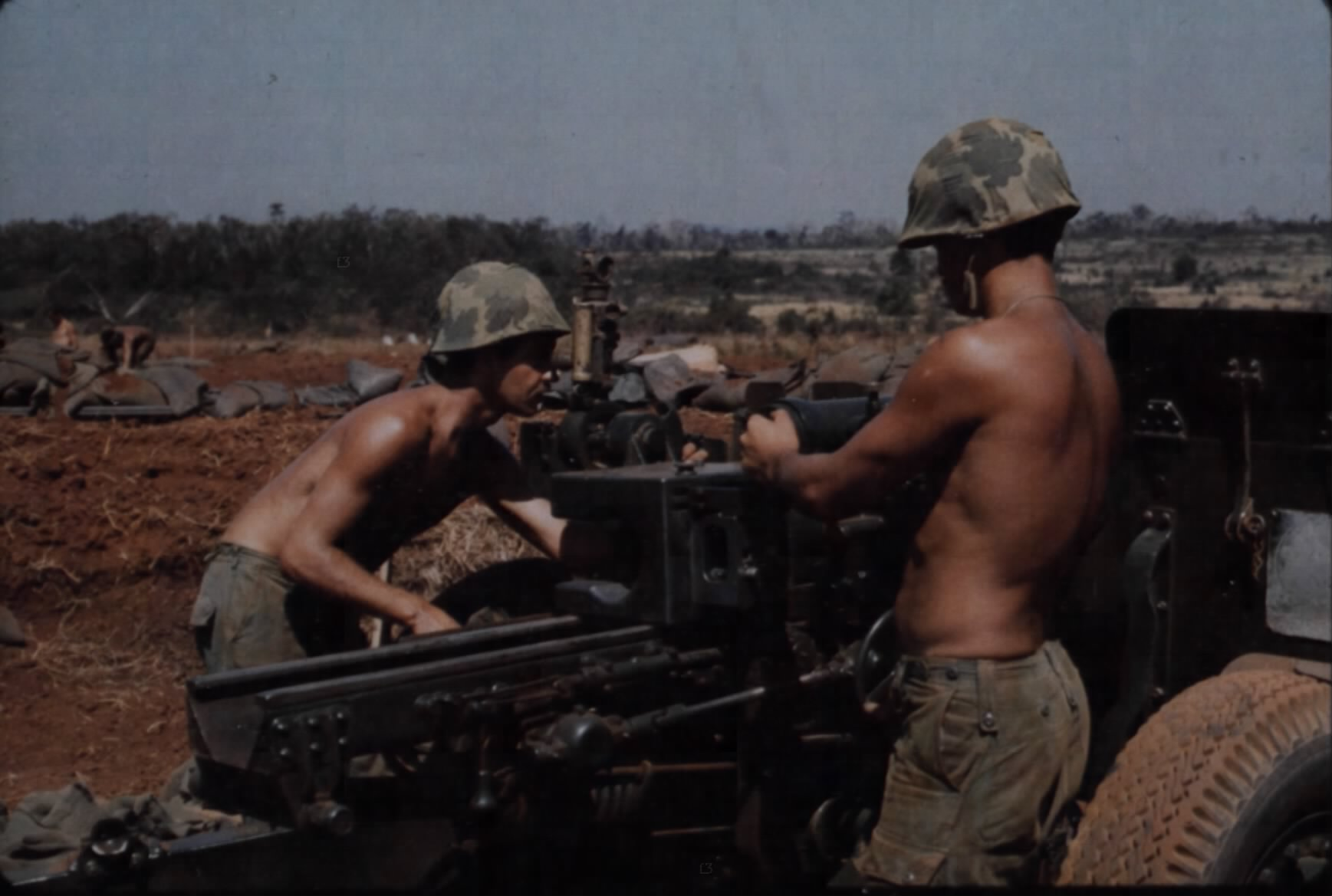
161 Bty prepare for a fire mission at Firebase Pat, 16 February 1970.

As Australian and New Zealand combat units began to be withdrawn in keeping with US troop reductions, the battery was withdrawn in May 1971. The battery was involved in 17 major operations during their time in Vietnam. It was the longest serving Allied unit in South Vietnam after the 173rd Airborne Brigade, having been continuously deployed for six years, ten months and 21 days.

Approximately 750 members of the 161st Battery served in Vietnam with a loss of 5 killed and 22 wounded.

=== 1980s–1990s ===
A range of new capabilities were introduced during this period. In 1986 the British designed, Australian produced 105-mm L119 Hamel Light Gun was introduced, while computerised artillery systems were introduced in 1989, and global positioning systems in 1997, which resulted in a significant increase in capability. In 1997 the French Mistral short range air defence missile was acquired, providing an anti-aircraft capability for the first time since 1961. The headquarters of 3rd Field Regiment RNZA was disbanded in 1990, with its two subordinate TF batteries remaining.

==== Territorial units ====
Territorial Force artillery units were formerly units of the RNZA, but were moved into the structure of the TF battalion groups on the restructuring of the army in the late 1990s:

- 11(A) Battery (Auckland) (Close Support), 3rd Auckland (Countess of Ranfurly's Own) and Northland Battalion Group (Amalgamated 1990s)
- 22(D) Battery (Wellington) (Air Defence), 7th Wellington (City of Wellington's Own) and Hawke's Bay Battalion Group (Disbanded 1990's)
- 31(B) Battery (Dunedin) 4th Otago and Southland Battalion Group (Disbanded 1990s)
- 32(E) Battery (Christchurch) (Observation Post), 2nd Canterbury, and Nelson-Marlborough and West Coast Battalion Group (Disbanded 1990s)
- 4 (G) Medium Battery (Hamilton) (Amalgamated 1990s)

== Twenty-first century ==
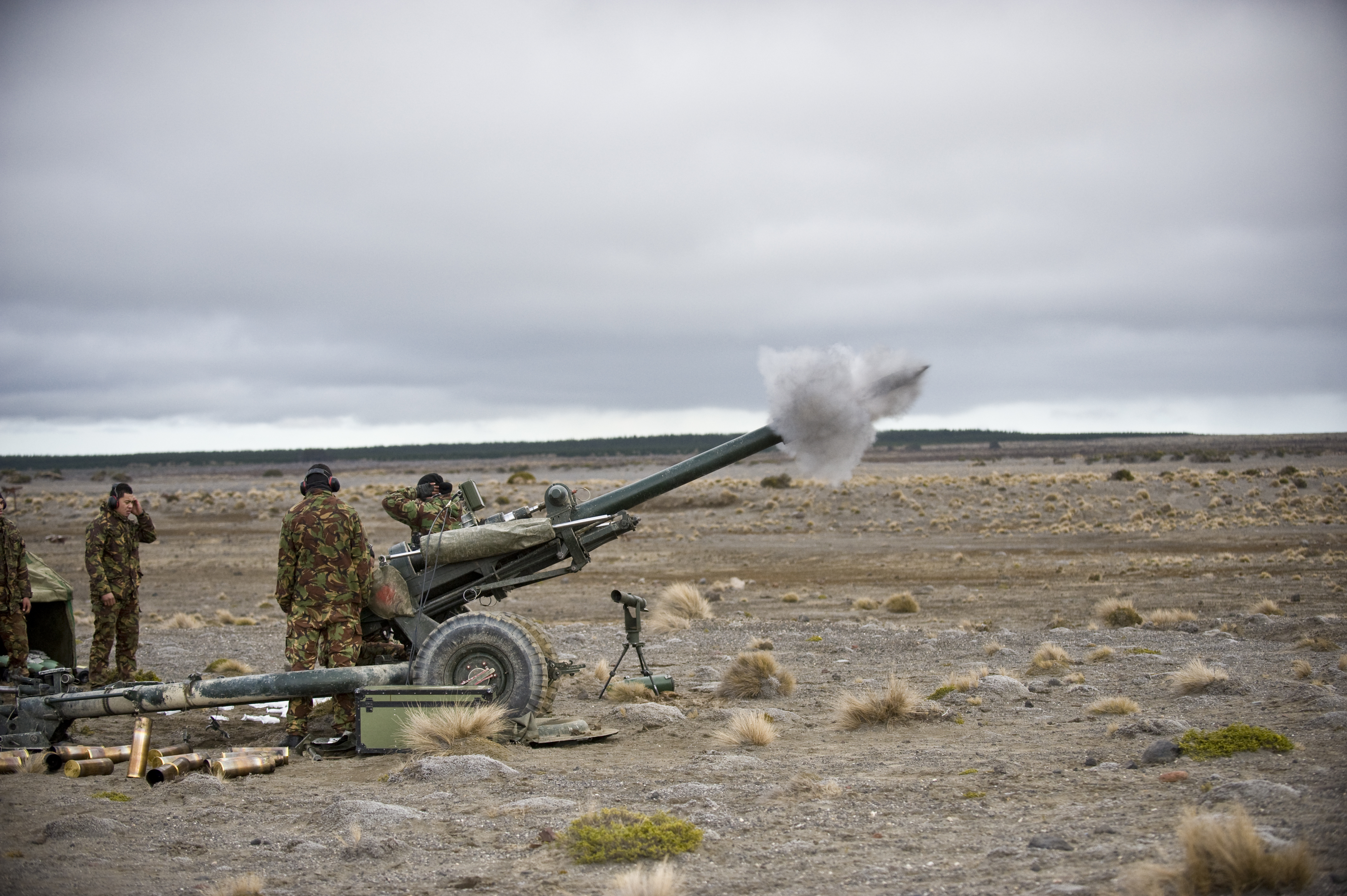
Gunners fire a L119 Light Gun in exercise at Waiouru, 2010

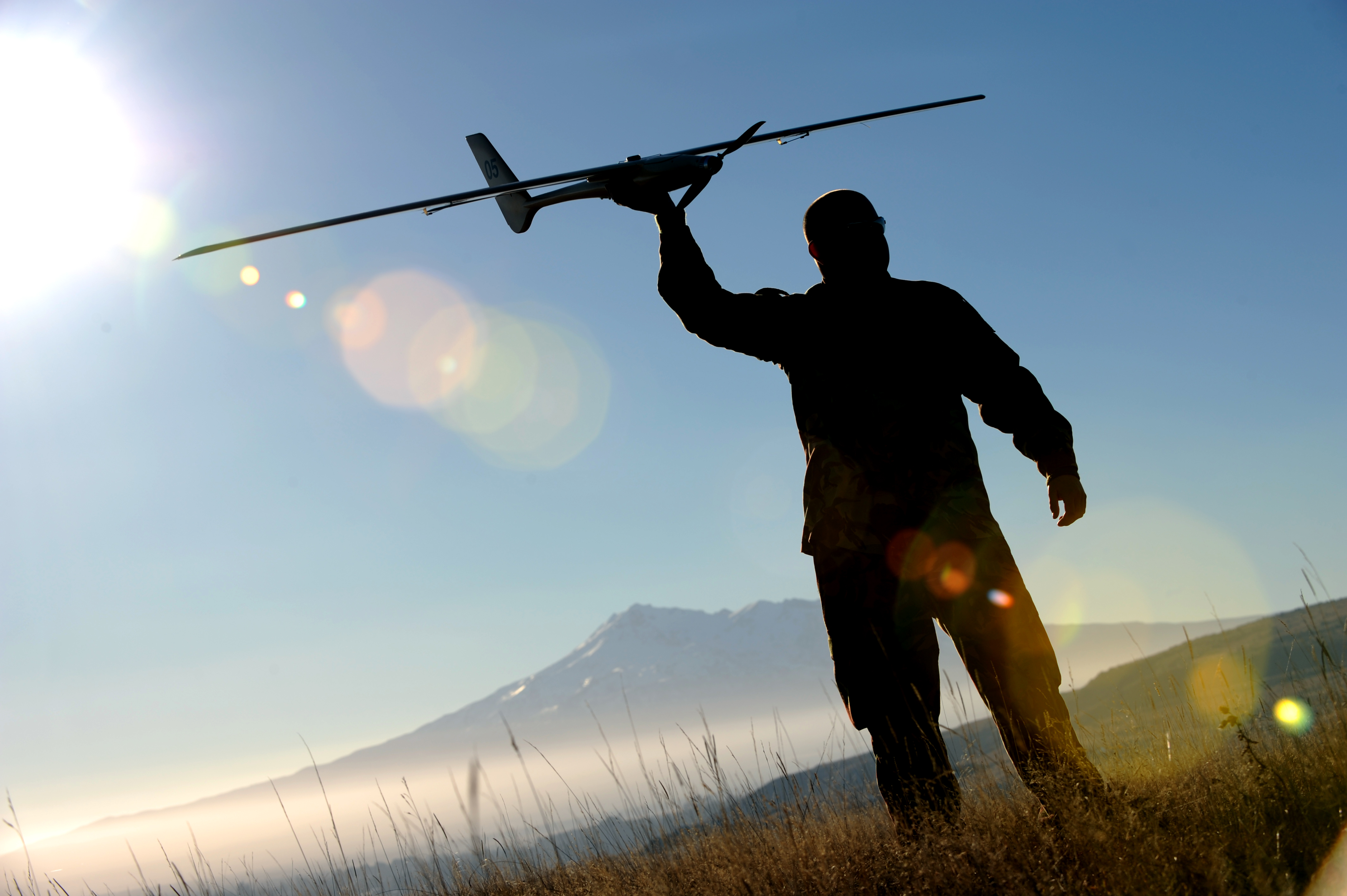
A member of 16 Field Regiment preparing to launch a Kahu UAV at Waiouru, 2008

Today, the RNZA consists of a single regiment:

- 16 Field Regiment, Royal New Zealand Artillery
  - Regimental Headquarters
  - HQ Battery
    - JOST Troop
  - 161 Battery (Close Support) – L119 Light Gun, L16A2 81mm mortar
    - Headquarters Troop
    - Able Troop
    - Baker Troop
    - Command Post Troop
  - 163 Battery (Close Support) – L119 Light Gun, L16A2 81mm mortar
    - Headquarters Troop
    - Easy Troop
    - Fox Troop
    - Command Post Troop

Members of the 16th Field Regiment formed part of the New Zealand Battalion deployed on peacekeeping operations in East Timor.

The School of Artillery is active.

RNZA Territorial-Reserve Batterys/Troops as of 2020:

- 11/4 Battery RNZA (comes under 16 Field Regiment RNZA)
- 22 Troop RNZA (Linton) (comes under 16 Field Regiment RNZA)

The Battle Honours of the above three Territorial Force artillery units are for South Africa, World War I and World War II.

== Distinctions ==
A composite unit of the RNZA became the first specific New Zealand unit to mount the Queen's Guard at Buckingham Palace in 1964 (previously, the contingents sent to the Coronation had mounted the guard).

The South Vietnam Presidential Unit Citation 1st Class was presented to 161 Bty in 1977 for its service in the Vietnam War as part of the 1st Battalion Group, Royal Australian Regiment (see Non-U.S. recipients of U.S. gallantry awards).

In 1995 the unit received the Meritorious Unit Commendation (MUC) in recognition of its service with the United States 173rd Airborne Brigade during the Vietnam War.

In 2011 the Governor General of New Zealand, on behalf of HM Queen Elizabeth II, gave permission for 16 Field Regt RNZA to wear the South Korean Presidential Unit Citation, by all Officers and NCO's attached to the Regiment, however after their appoints finish with the Regiment the Citation is handed back to the Regiment.

In 2019 the Australian government awarded veterans of 161 Battery who had fought at the Battles of Coral and Balmoral the Australian Unit Citation for Gallantry for "extraordinary gallantry".

== Uniform ==
The RNZA were distinguished by a blue and red puggaree around the traditional "Lemon Squeezer" hat of the New Zealand Army, until this headdress fell into abeyance in the late 1950s. It has subsequently been reintroduced for ceremonial use but the RNZA now wear the same red puggaree as most other corps and regiments. Artillery officers wore a dark blue jacket and trousers with red lapels and trouser stripes for mess dress but this has now been phased out in favour of a universal scarlet mess jacket worn by all branches of the Army.

== Band ==
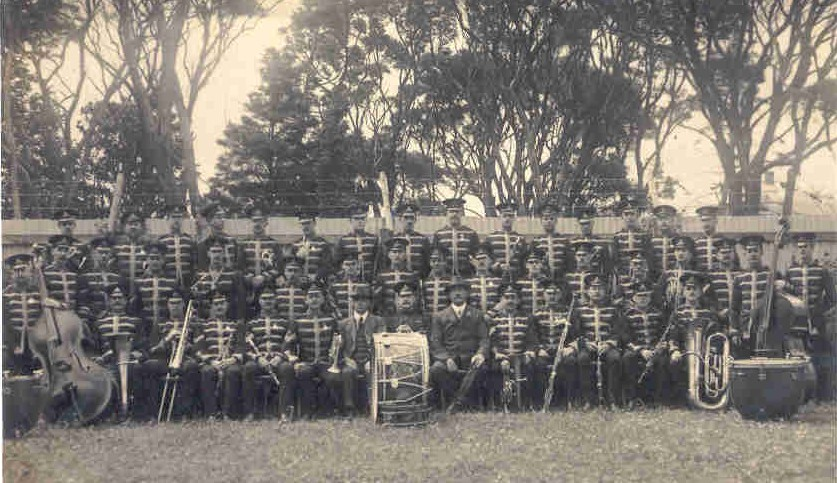
The band's group picture in 1912.

The Band of the Royal Regiment of New Zealand Artillery (abbreviated to Royal NZ Artillery Band) is an Auckland-based supporting musical unit for the Royal New Zealand Artillery. It is specifically based out of Panmure, a south-eastern suburb of Auckland and is affiliated with the 16th Field Regiment, RNZA. It is a volunteer band since being disestablished as an NZDF unit in 2012. However it remains supported by the Regiment through a formal agreement. As of 2021, the band is the oldest surviving military band in the country, being founded in 1864. The band performs at a range of events that include commemorations, ceremonies, concerts, Military Tattoos, Military Parades and medal presentation ceremonies.

== Affiliations ==
- United Kingdom – Royal Artillery
- Canada – Royal Canadian Artillery
- Australia – Royal Australian Artillery

== Gallery ==
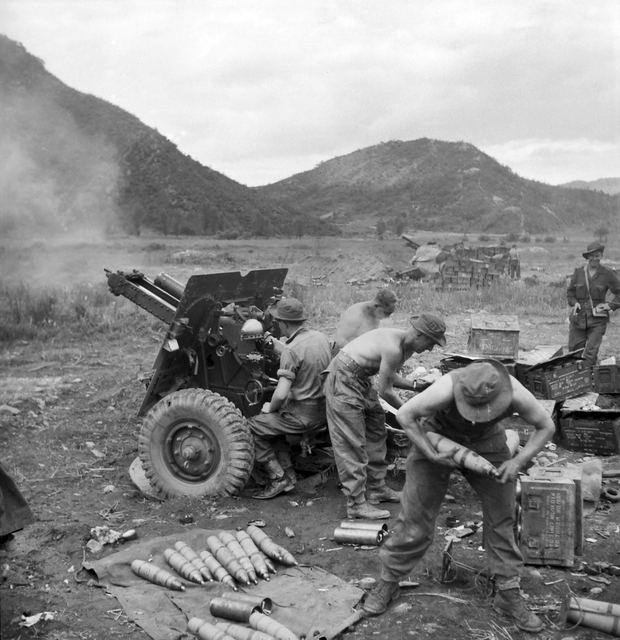
New Zealand gunners firing a 25-pounder in Korea.

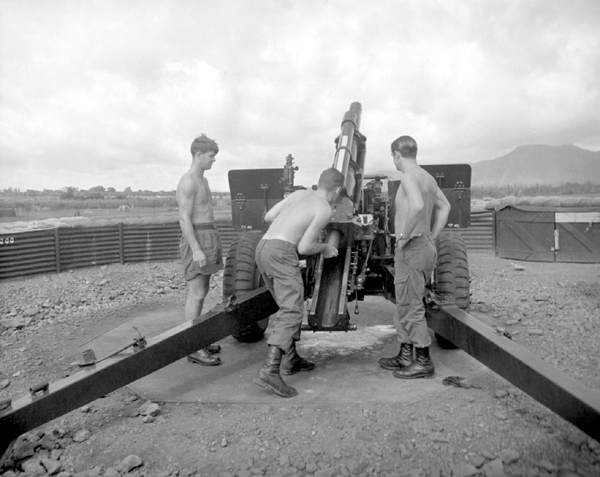
New Zealand gunners in Vietnam operating an M2A2 Howitzer.

== Order of precedence ==
Preceded by New Zealand Corps of Officer Cadets	New Zealand Army Order of Precedence	Succeeded by Royal New Zealand Armoured Corps

== See also ==
- Coastal fortifications of New Zealand
