= 5th Light Regiment, Royal New Zealand Artillery =

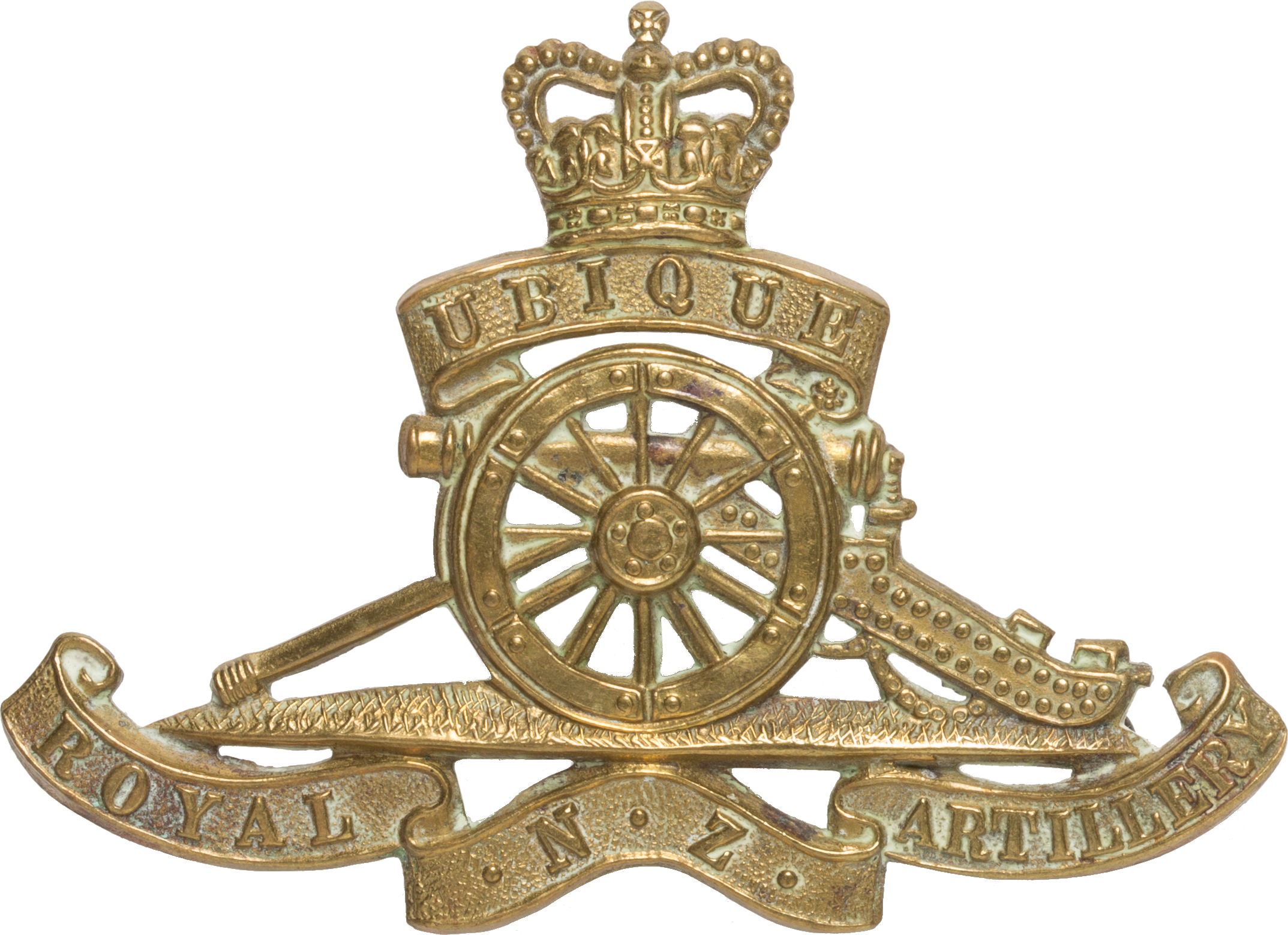
- Cap badge of the Royal New Zealand Artillery
- Active: 1952–1964
- Country: New Zealand
- Branch: Royal New Zealand Artillery
- Type: Territorial Force mortar regiment
- Role: Light Artillery
- Part of: Commander Royal Artillery, New Zealand Division (c.1949–1960s)
- Garrison/HQ: Invercargill
- Motto(s): Ubique (Everywhere) (Latin)
- March: Quick – The Right of the Line; Slow – The Duchess of Kent

Commanders
- Captain General: HM The Queen

The 5th Light Regiment Royal Regiment of New Zealand Artillery was a unit of the New Zealand Divisional Artillery (Div Arty). It was formed in 1952 to provide each of the division's brigades with a supporting mortar battery. The regiment contained members of both the Territorial and Regular Forces and had its headquarters in Wellington and batteries in Petone, Napier and Gore. It moved to Southland in 1956 and was headquartered in Invercargill. The Regiment was disbanded in 1964 as part of a reorganisation of the New Zealand Army's artillery units.

== Affiliations ==
- United Kingdom – Royal Artillery
- Canada – Royal Canadian Artillery
- Australia – Royal Australian Artillery
