= Stony Batter =

Defence installation off Auckland, New Zealand

Coordinates: 36.76237°S 175.174964°E

- Waiheke Island, Auckland, New Zealand
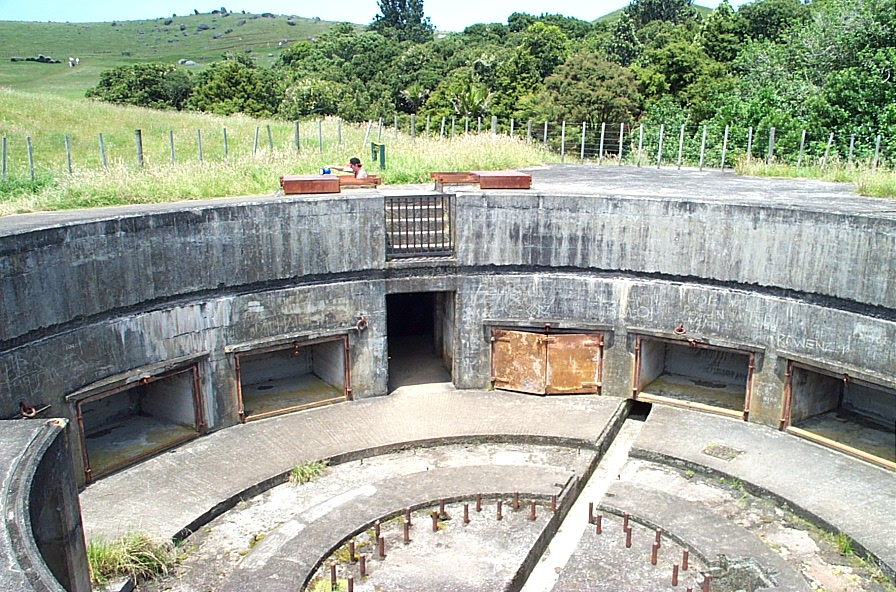
- One of the gun emplacements
- Stony Batter volcanics map. Clicking on the map enlarges it, and enables panning and mouseover of volcanic feature name/wikilink and ages before present. The key to the other volcanics that are shown with panning is basalt - brown, monogenetic basalts - dark brown, undifferentiated basalts of the Tangihua Complex in Northland Allochthon - light brown, arc basalts - deep orange brown, arc ring basalts -orange brown, andesite - red, dacite - purple, rhyolite - violet, basaltic andesite`- light red, ignimbrite (lighter shades of violet), and plutonic - gray.

Site information
- Type: Military defense
- Controlled by: New Zealand Department of Conservation
- Open to the public: Yes

Site history
- Built: 1943

Stony Batter is a historic defence installation at the north-eastern end of Waiheke Island, Auckland, New Zealand. It is sited within a 50-acre (200,000 m^{2}) scenic reserve of the same name, owned by the New Zealand Department of Conservation (DOC). The park serves double duty as a historical (Category 1 Historic Place) and nature reserve, containing unusual rock formations, associated with an extinct volcano, three significant bush blocks and three concrete gun emplacements with an extensive tunnel system, reputed to be the largest in New Zealand.

== Geography ==
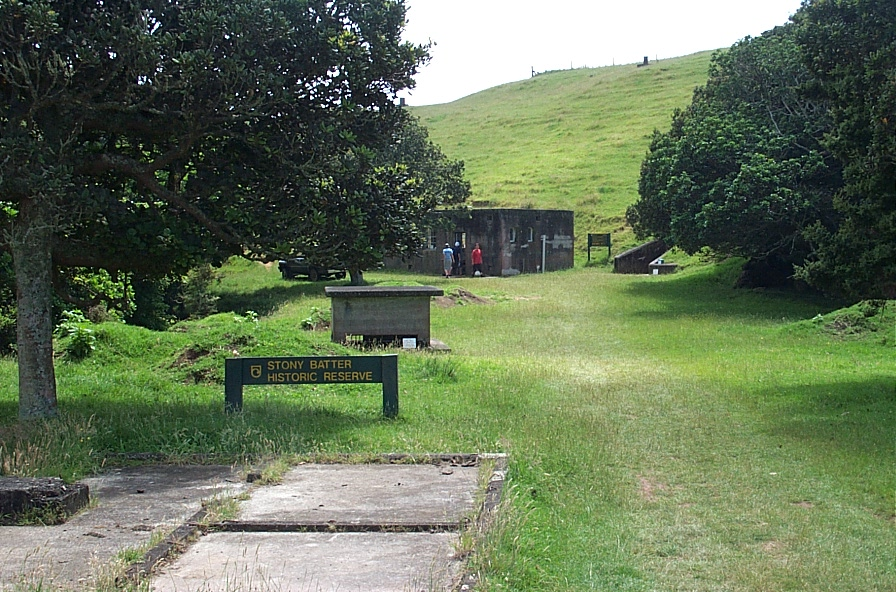
Entrance to Stony Batter tunnels

Stony Batter is located in the remote north-east of Waiheke Island, in a hilly area strewn with volcanic basalt. The location has a wide view over Waiheke Island and the Hauraki Gulf.

== Counterbattery ==
=== History ===
Stony Batter was part of a counter-bombardment battery system progressively being installed in the Hauraki Gulf from the 1930s. Composed of various gun batteries, such as at Whangaparaoa, Motutapu Island and at Stony Batter, as well as having observation posts such at Rangitoto Island (command post) and Tiritiri Matangi Island, it was supposed to engage enemy naval forces entering the inner gulf. Ranges would have been too far beyond the line of sight (over 30 km, thus the need for a complex set of observation points and communication lines), as well as at least initially beyond the range of most enemy ships' ability to retaliate.

While approved in 1939, construction was delayed for cost reasons until German raiders were sighted in New Zealand waters during 1940–1941, as well as the war entry of Japan in late 1941, suddenly turned it into a high-priority project. In 1942, the site on Waiheke was chosen, but it took until early 1943 before the Public Works Department was finally tasked with construction after other contractors declined the job. Construction began in October 1943, and it was initially thought that the battery would take 12 months to complete. Delays were caused by the remote location, which at first had no road access, and also by the fact that the project was kept in strict secrecy, requiring with a large degree of self-sufficiency during the construction period, complete with its own living facilities and machine shops. The new battery was generally referred to only as A2, to conceal its location.

The tunnels and underground chambers were quarried by hand, with formwork for the walls and ceilings, then filled with concrete (reinforcing steel was not used due to shortages). Aggregate was obtained from the prominent rocky outcrops, giving Stony Batter its name. The tunnels and chambers were designed based on plans of the Tawa Flat railway tunnels project. The work on the installations, sans guns, was completed behind schedule in 1944, and had by then ballooned from initial estimates of £140,000 to £327,966, excluding the costs of the guns. By 1945, the immediate threat of war had subsided, and many of the workers were transferred to work on the hydroelectric plants built on the Waikato River. By 1955, all material that could be deteriorated was removed from the site. Construction of the battery was, however, considered a major feat of engineering, carried out under particularly difficult circumstances. As the tides of war turned, only two BL 9.2-inch Mk IX – X naval guns were installed, one in 1944, and one in 1948. The third gun was cancelled before shipment. Never fired except for testing and training purposes, the guns were dismantled and sold for scrap in 1961.

An extensive vineyard on the surrounding privately owned farm is also named after the installation. For almost two decades, the farm's owner had a dispute with Auckland City over public access to the reserve, finally resolved in 2002 by the Privy Council agreeing with the council's case providing public access. If one examines the lead up to the access dispute, one finds that the land owner alleged he was suffering losses through theft of his farm stock, some of which were barbecued on site, and others were trucked off the farm to be butchered elsewhere on the island. The thefts were of such a magnitude, said to be tens of thousands of dollar value per annum, that the viability of the stock fattening part of the landowner's business was being jeopardised. John Spencer, the landowner at the time, took one of the few options open to him and blocked access to his property.

The battery is now in the hands of a preservation society, which keeps it open for the public under a concession from DOC. The preservation society is currently trying to source an appropriate artillery piece to restore at least one gunpit to a similar state as it would have appeared in late World War II.

=== Characteristics ===
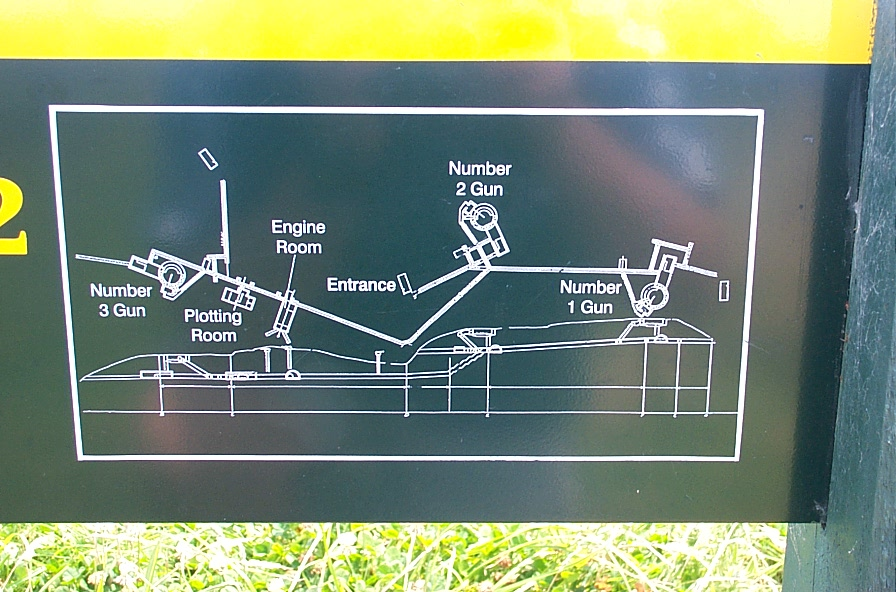
Layout of tunnel system

The 9.2 inch guns that were once installed in two of the gun pits had ranges of 31,300 yards (over 30 km) and a possible rate of fire of one round per minute. This made them the largest guns ever used in New Zealand. Their mountings could swivel them 360° and elevate up to 35°. They were served by ammunitions storage lockers in the base of each gun pit, which were in turn fed by large electric hoists from underground ammunition dumps.

Next to the gun pits, which can be accessed at any time, the site also contains around a kilometre of tunnels, most of which are accessible by guided tour. These connected the gun pits with each other and with their ammunition stores, a plotting room, an engine room providing electricity, as well as with storerooms and barrack (located aboveground).

Open to The Public. In June 2020 DoC issued a Concession Lease to operate guided tours to Fort Stony Batter Heritage Park Ltd. Tours commenced in December 2020 Wed thru Sunday until May 2021. After which the Tunnels will close temporarily to the public for winter restoration work- reopening again in December 2021. For more details www.stonybattertunnels.nz

== See also ==
- Coastal fortifications of New Zealand
  - North Head, New Zealand, administrative centre of the coastal defense
  - Wrights Hill Fortress, a similar installation in Wellington
