= List of disappearing gun installations =

This is a list of disappearing gun installations. These are artillery installed behind fortification walls with mechanisms that lift the gun for firing and then retract it to protection. These were installed, especially in coastal defenses, from the 1860s until as late as 1923, and were in service as late as the beginning of World War II.

Guns in retractable turrets within the Maginot Line and the Atlantic Wall that are sometimes termed "disappearing guns", are not included.

The locations of some still-existing installations may be seen in linked OSM or Google maps.

== On land ==
- Australia
  - Ben Buckler Gun Battery, North Bondi, New South Wales
  - Flagstaff Hill Fort, Wollongong, New South Wales
  - Fort Queenscliff, Port Phillip, Victoria, with a recovered gun from South Channel Fort
  - Fort Nepean, Port Phillip, Victoria
  - Fort Scratchley, Newcastle, New South Wales
  - Henry Head Battery, Sydney, New South Wales
  - Steel Point Battery, Vaucluse, Sydney, New South Wales
  - Signal Hill Battery, Watsons Bay, Sydney, New South Wales
  - South Channel Fort, Port Phillip, Victoria
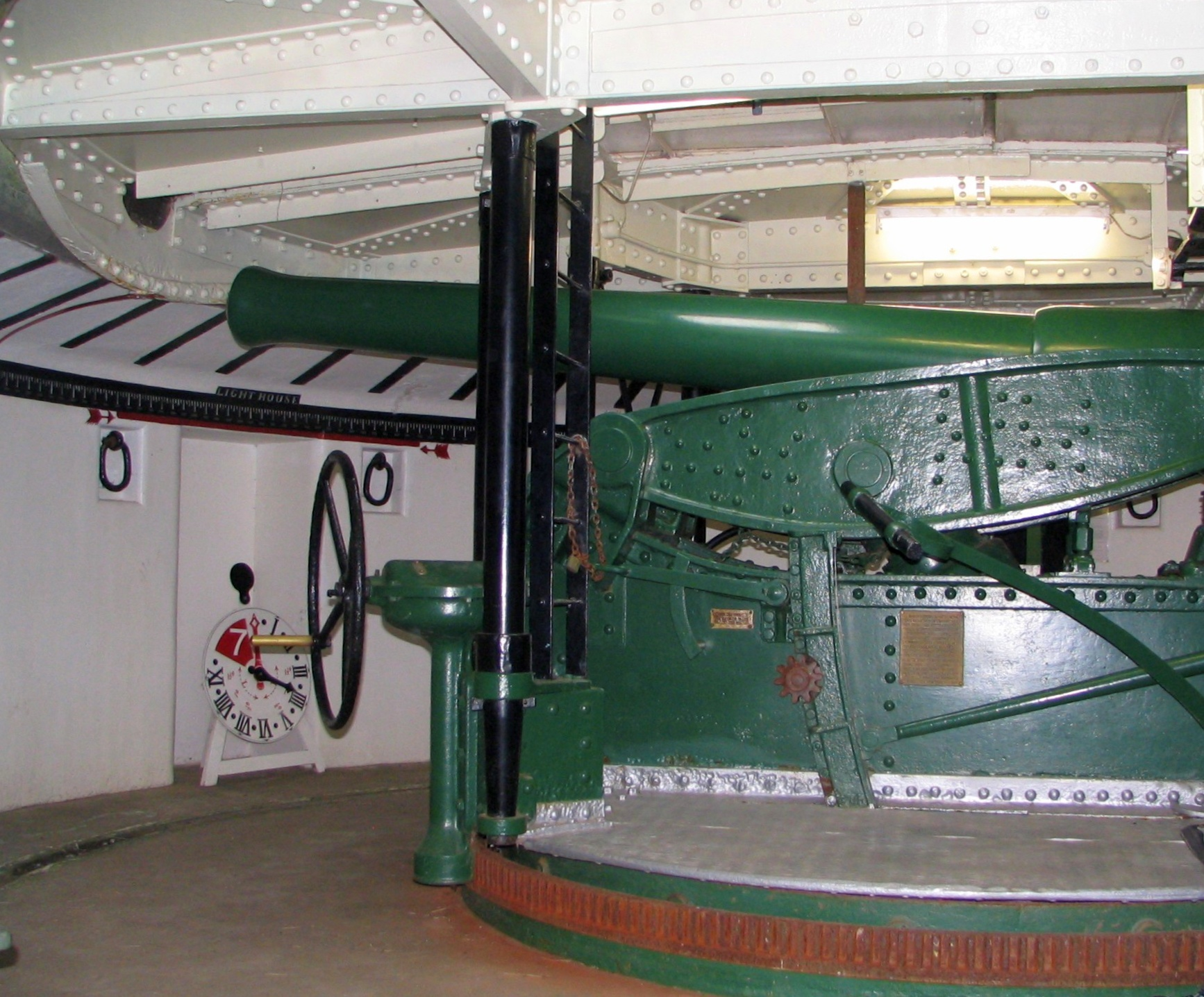
    Armstrong BL 6-inch Mk V disappearing gun at Taiaroa Head, New Zealand
  - Fort Lytton, Brisbane, Queensland
- Bermuda
  - Scaur Hill Fort, 64-pounder rifled muzzle loaders on Moncrieff disappearing mounts
- Canada
  - Cape Spear, Newfoundland 10-inch ex-US Buffington-Crozier-mounted guns installed in WWII; the tubes remain, but the mounts were scrapped.
  - Fort Rodd Hill, British Columbia
- Hong Kong
  - Hong Kong Museum of Coastal Defence (formerly Lei Yue Mun Fort), Hong Kong
- New Zealand (Armstrong Disappearing Guns)
  - Fort Ballance (Miramar, Wellington), one barrel of a BL 8-inch gun recovered
  - Fort Jervois (Lyttelton), one mostly intact BL 6-inch Mk V and one working-order BL 8-inch gun
  - North Head (North Shore, Auckland), one remaining gun barrel with mostly intact carriage
  - Taiaroa Head (Dunedin) one restored BL 6-inch Mk V
- Philippines
  - Fort Mills, Corregidor Island, Manila Bay, Luzon
  - Fort Frank and Fort Hughes, Carabao and Caballo Islands, Manila Bay, Luzon
  - Fort Wint, Grande Island, Subic Bay, Luzon
- South Africa
  - 9.2-inch disappearing gun in Fort Wynyard, Cape Town. Visible in Google Earth. 33°54.136′S 18°24.807′E
  - Formerly buried disappearing gun in Sea Point, Cape Town.
- Thailand
  - Phraya Chulachomklao Fort, Bangkok, seven Armstrong BL 6-inch guns on hydropneumatic disappearing carriages, all in working condition
- United Kingdom
  - Flat Holm, Bristol Channel, Wales
  - Fort Cumberland, Portsmouth, England
  - Crownhill Fort, Plymouth, England
  - Pendennis Castle, Falmouth
- United States

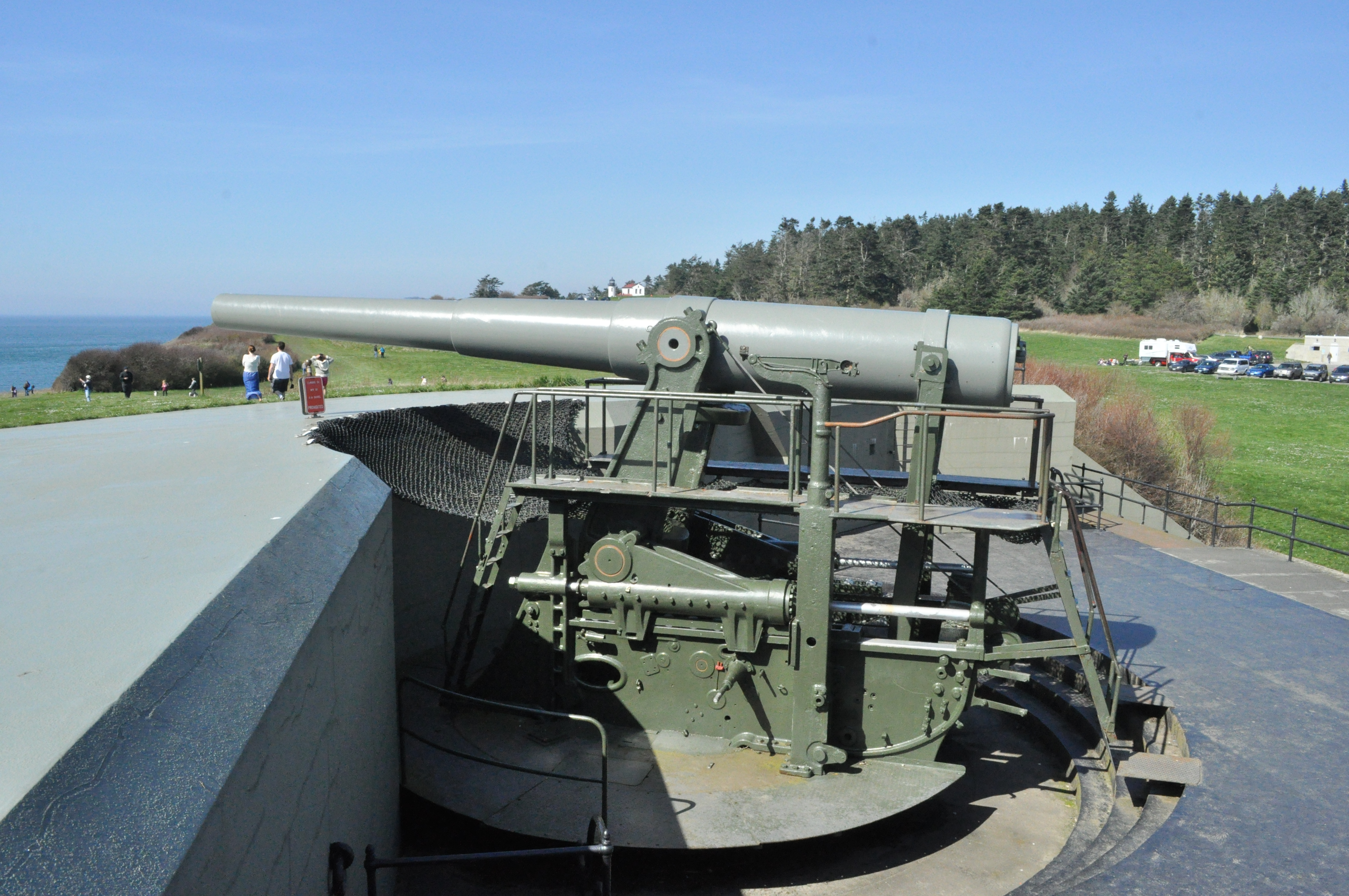
10-inch disappearing gun at Fort Casey, Washington State, US

  - See Harbor Defense Command for a list of US forts 1890–1945, most with disappearing guns
  - Fort Miley, California had two 12-inch rifled guns mounted on Buffington-Crozier disappearing carriages.
  - Battery Chamberlin, Presidio of San Francisco. Four-gun battery, with one of the few Buffington-Crozier disappearing carriages still operating. 37.793607°N 122.482835°W)
  - Batteries Mendell and Alexander at Fort Barry defended San Francisco Bay
  - Fort Mott, New Jersey, Harbor Defenses of the Delaware, defense of Philadelphia, had three 12-inch disappearing guns by about 1901, and also three 10-inch guns added to the battery by 1903.
  - Battery Potter, Fort Hancock, Sandy Hook, New Jersey. This is the only remaining steam hydraulic (gun lift) battery.
  - Fort Casey, Washington. Battery Worth (48°09′51.8″N 122°40′39.4″W), one of the Fort Casey batteries, is home of two Buffington-Crozier mounted guns moved from Fort Wint (Subic Bay, Philippines)
  - Fort Stevens, Oregon, the only military installation in the continental United States to receive hostile fire during World War II
  - Battery Cooper at Fort Pickens near Pensacola, Florida contains one 6-inch M1905 gun on a disappearing carriage.
  - Fort Wool, Virginia. Built at the entrance to the Hampton Roads area of Virginia just past the Chesapeake Bay
  - Fort Fremont, Saint Helena Island, South Carolina. 1899–1912. Three 10-inch disappearing guns (removed) overlooking Port Royal sound, and Parris Island

== Afloat ==
Listed here are ships having guns with mechanisms active with firing; not listed are gunboats where guns could be lowered merely to lower the ships' center of gravity.

- HMS Temeraire
- Russian battleship Ekaterina II
