= Henry Head Battery =

Artillery battery in New South Wales, Australia

- Little Bay in Australia
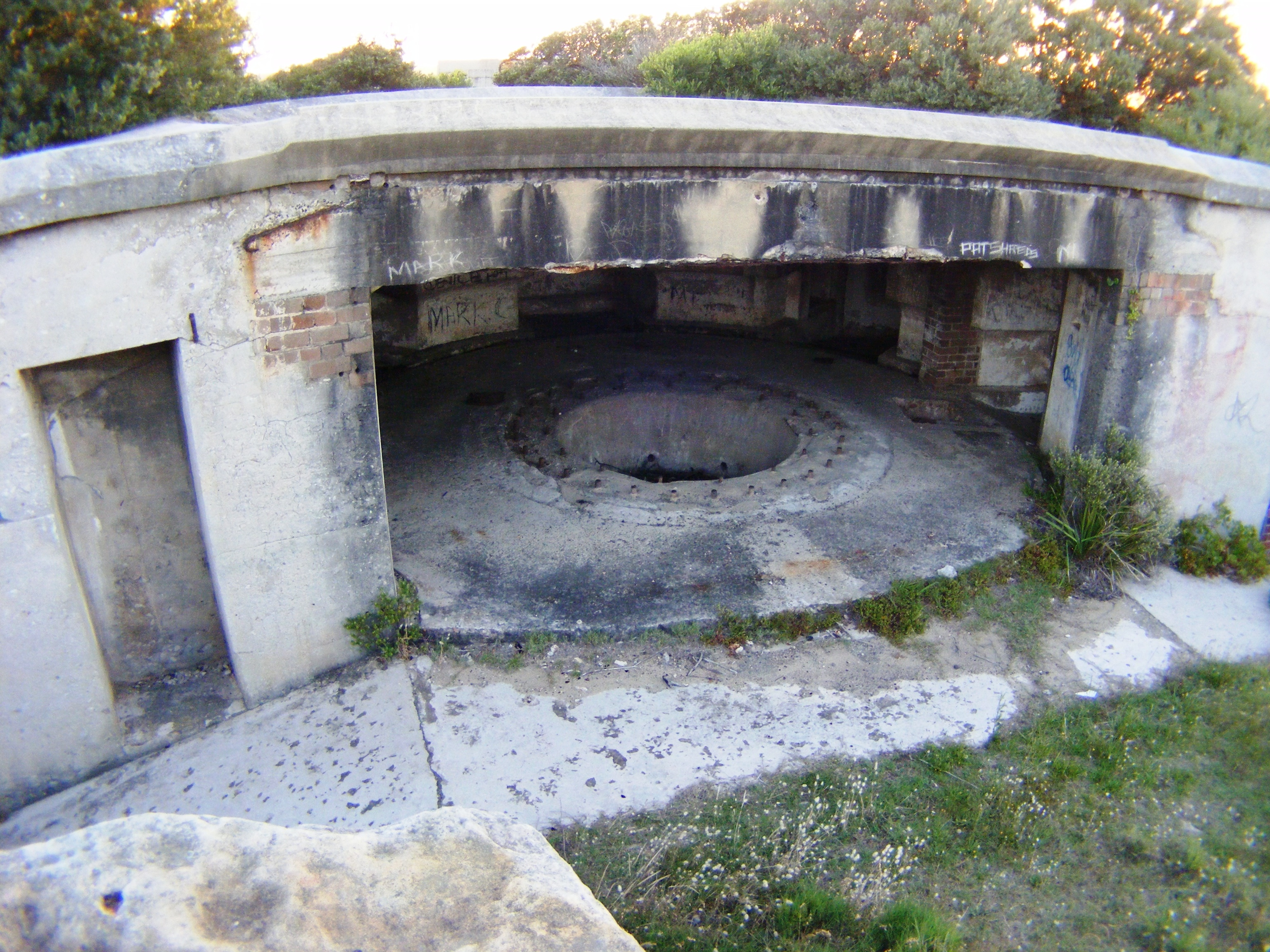
- 6" gun emplacement from the rear exterior of the fortification

Location
- Coordinates: 33°59′54″S 151°14′17″E

Site history
- Built: 1892–1895
- In use: 1895–1910

The Henry Head Battery is an artillery battery on the northern side of the entrance to Botany Bay at Henry Head, La Perouse, New South Wales Australia.

== History ==
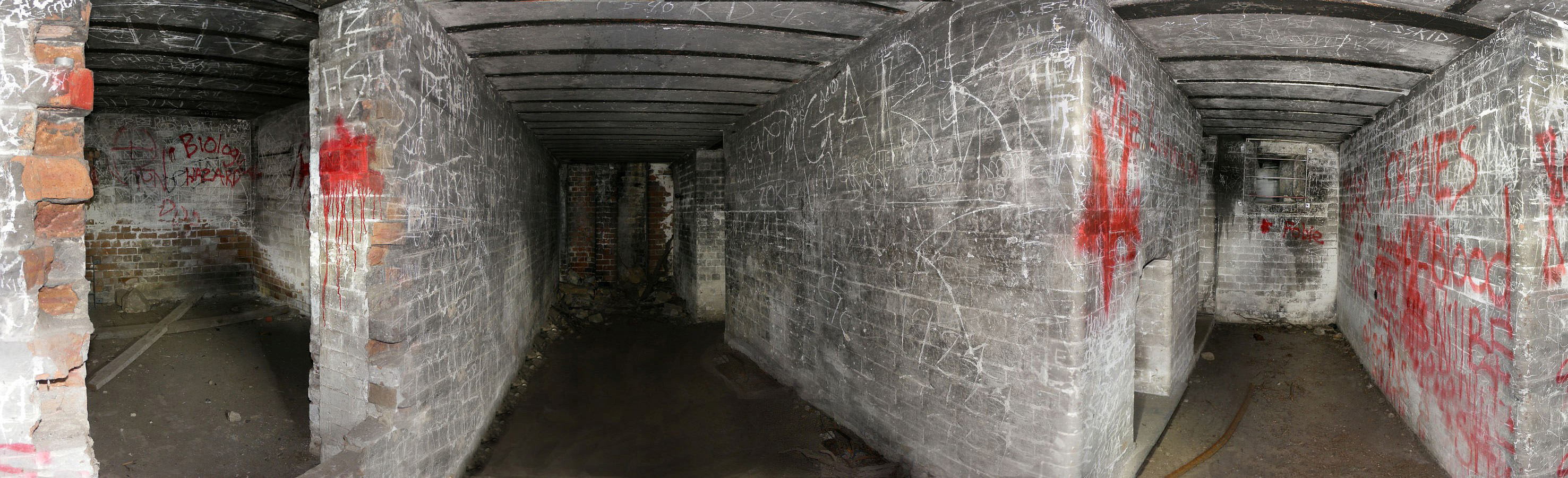
Inside the fort

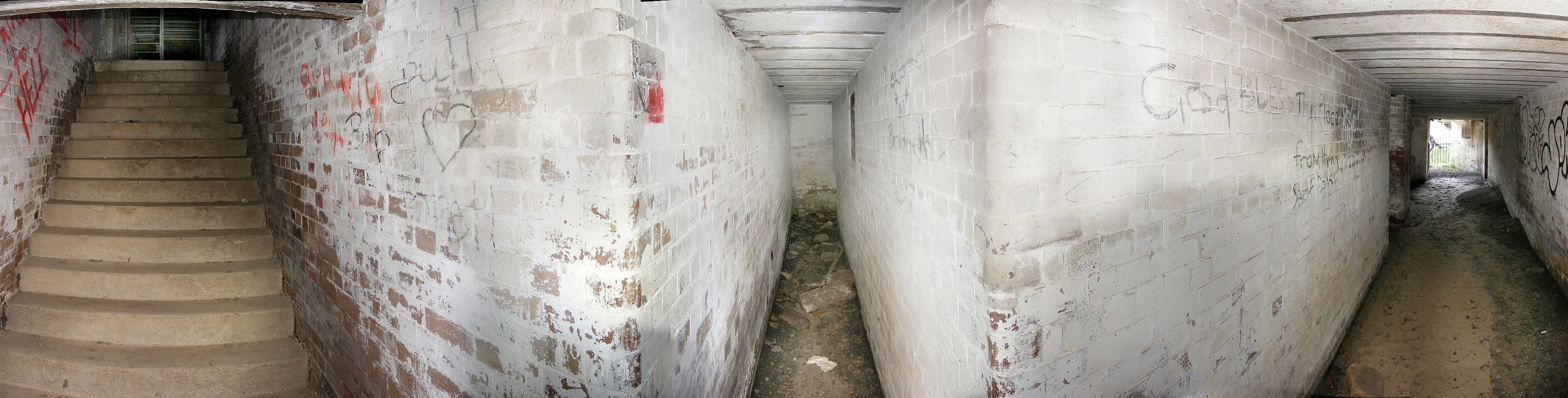
Inside Henry Head Battery

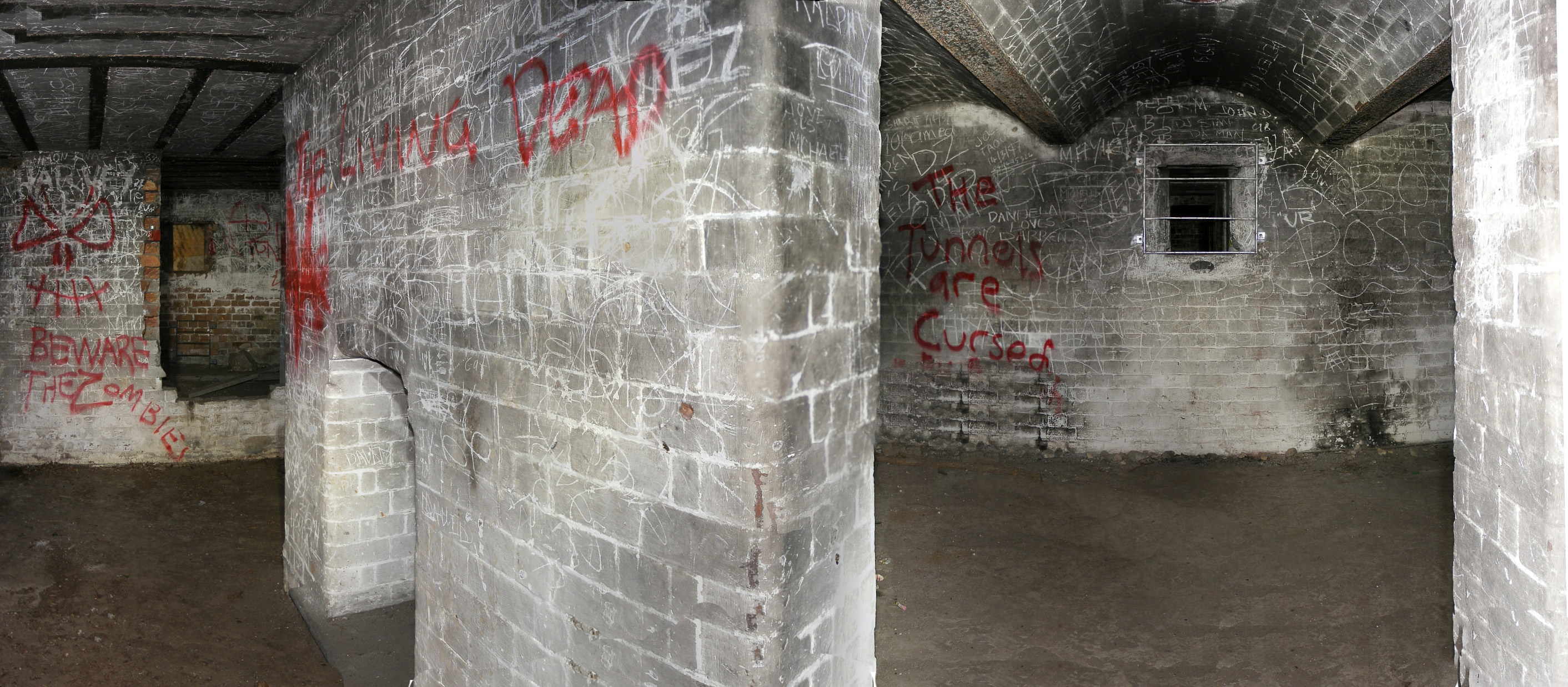

Constructed between 1892–1895 with 2 BL 6-inch Mk V disappearing guns, the fort operated until 1910, after which it became obsolete.

The battery, along with two six-inch (152.4 mm – diameter) gun emplacements and observation posts, was re-employed during World War II to defend the approaches to Botany Bay. During WWII, it was armed with two 18-pounder Mk IV field guns and two QF 3-pounder Hotchkiss guns. The underground bunker and tunnel complex consisted of vaulted ammunition storage rooms with double walls and ceilings, which were designed to stop them collapsing in the event of a direct hit.

The remains of the fortifications can still be seen.

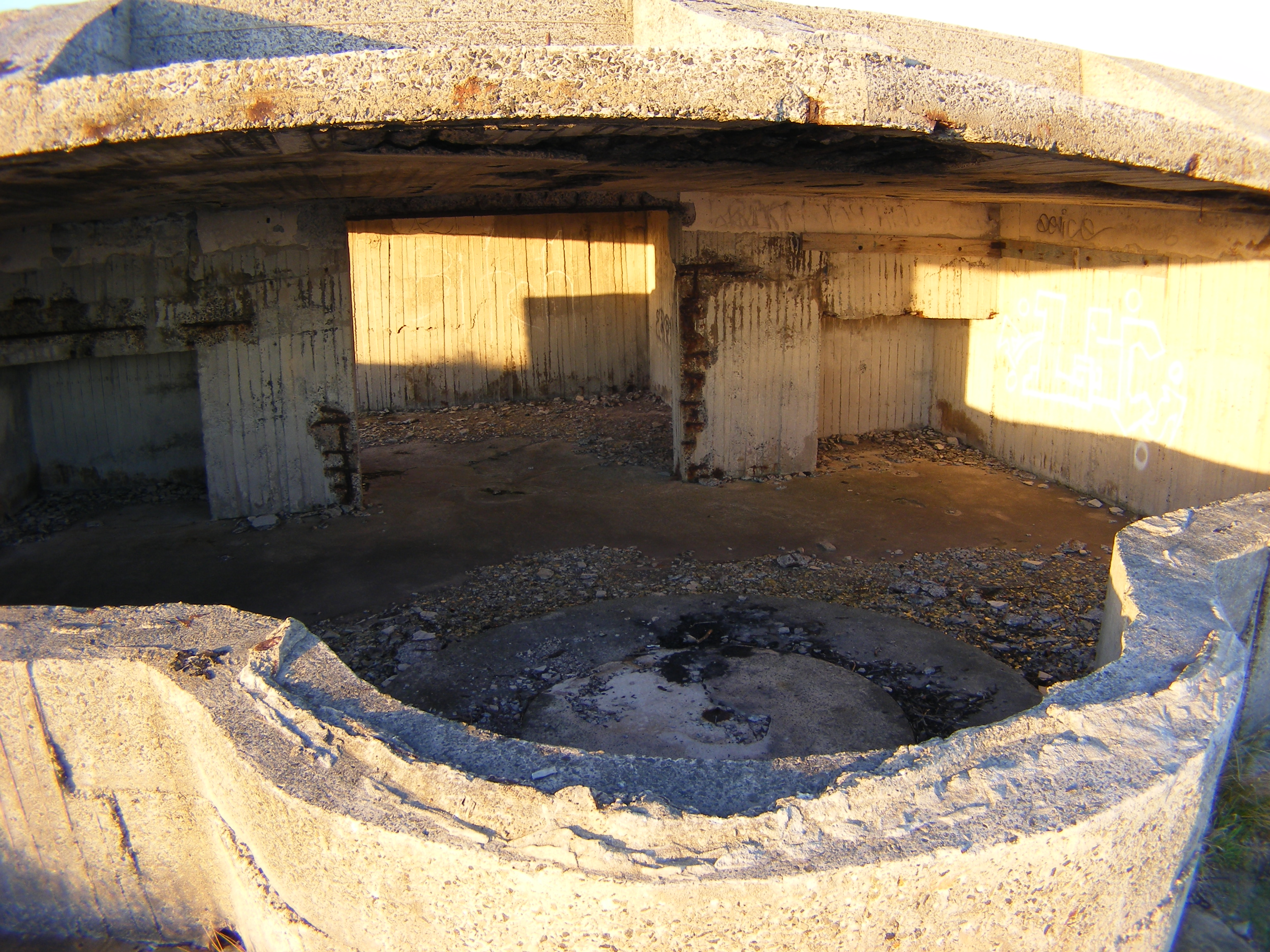
1 of 2 search emplacements

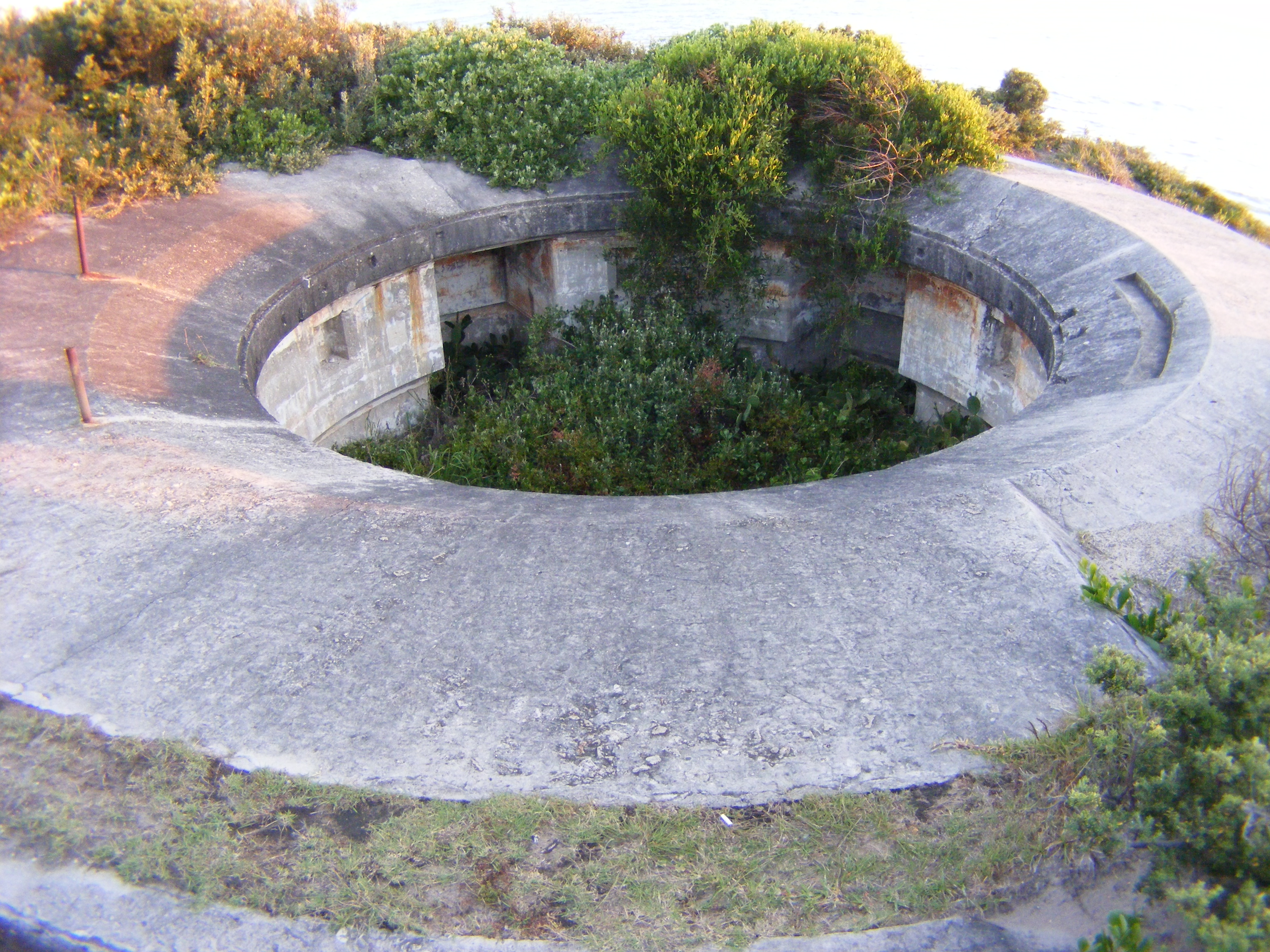
6" BL disappearing gun emplacement
