= Vulcan (automobile company) =

Defunct American motor vehicle manufacturer

Vulcan Manufacturing Company
- Industry: Automotive
- Founded: 1914; 112 years ago
- Defunct: 1916; 110 years ago
- Headquarters: Painesville, Ohio, United States

Vulcan Model 27 advertisement (1913)

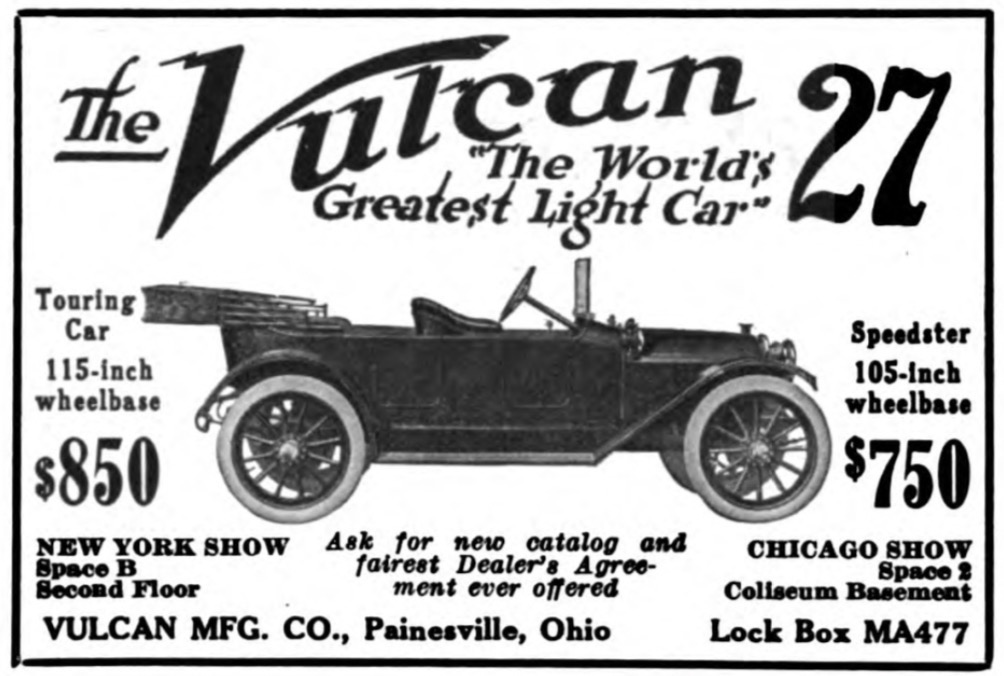
Vulcan Model 27

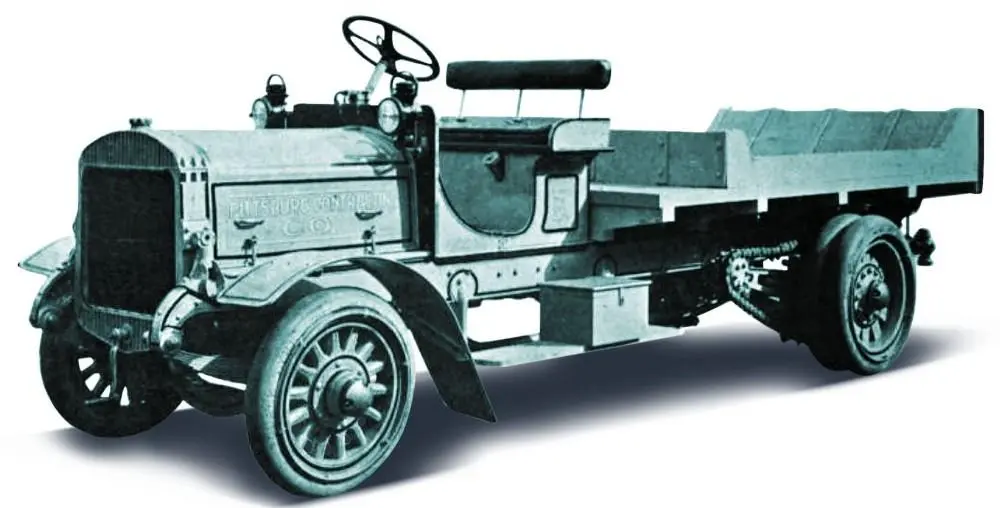
Driggs-Seabury Vulcan

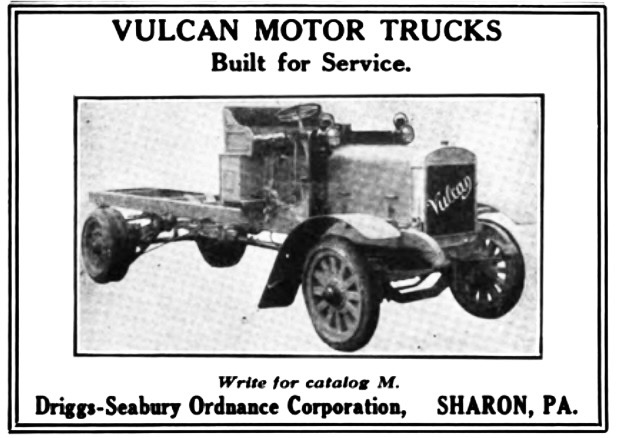
Vulcan Motor Trucks advertisement (1913)

Vulcan Manufacturing Company was an American brass era automobile manufacturer based in Painesville, Ohio, founded in 1914.

Vulcan's first products were the Model 27 speedster and five-passenger tourer. They ran on a 115 in (2,900 mm) wheelbase and had a 27 hp (20 kW) engine 3 3/8 in × 5 in (86 mm × 127 mm) and left-hand drive. The speedster was US$750 and the tourer $850, compared to $650 for the high-volume Oldsmobile Runabout.

The Vulcan Power Wagon truck was produced around 1915, at least some under license by Driggs-Seabury, and was rated at three to seven tons depending on model.

== Sources ==
- Clymer, Floyd (1950). Treasury of Early American Automobiles, 1877-1925. New York, NY, US: Bonanza Books.
