= Twombly (cyclecar) =

Defunct American motor vehicle manufacturer

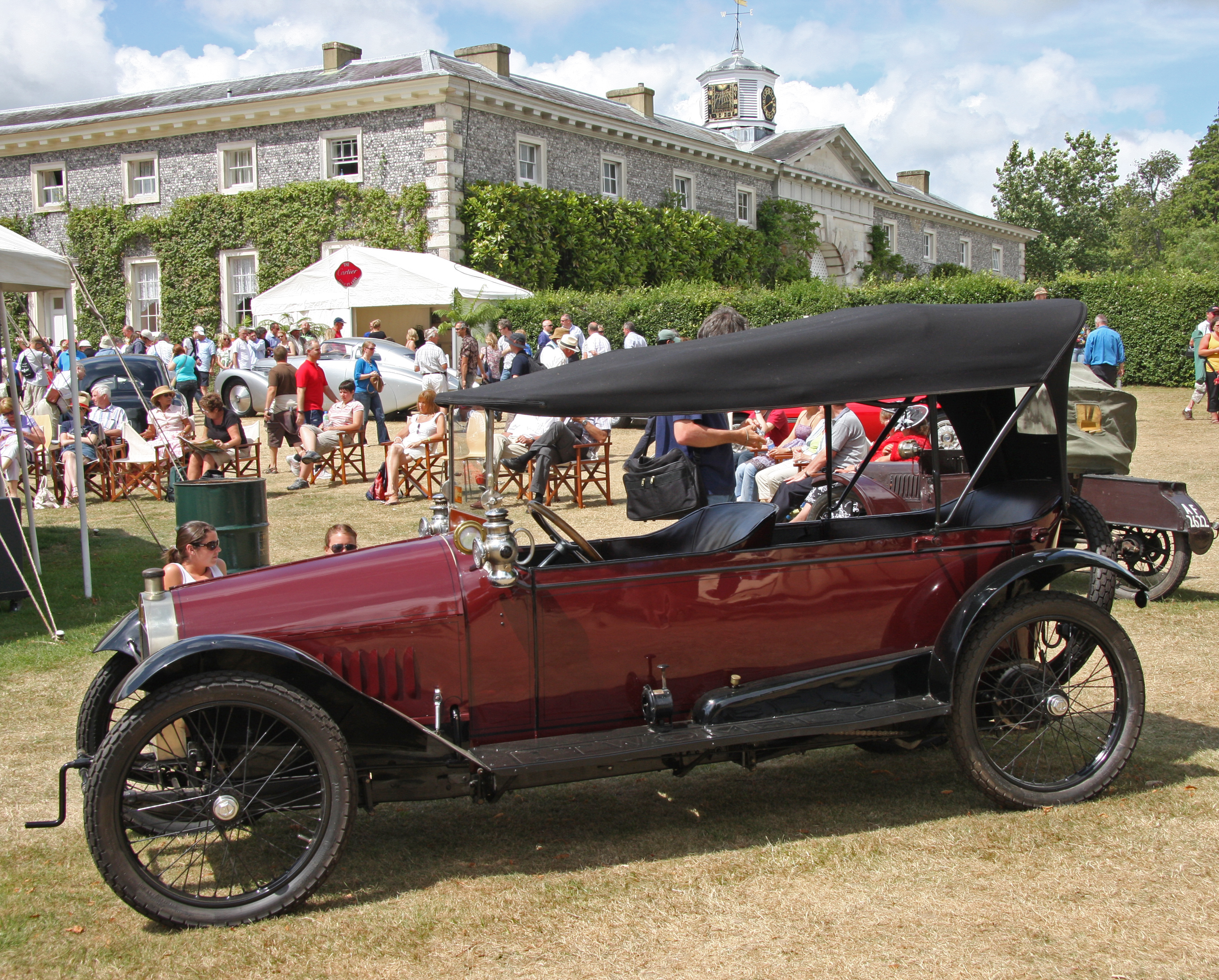
1914 Twombly Model A

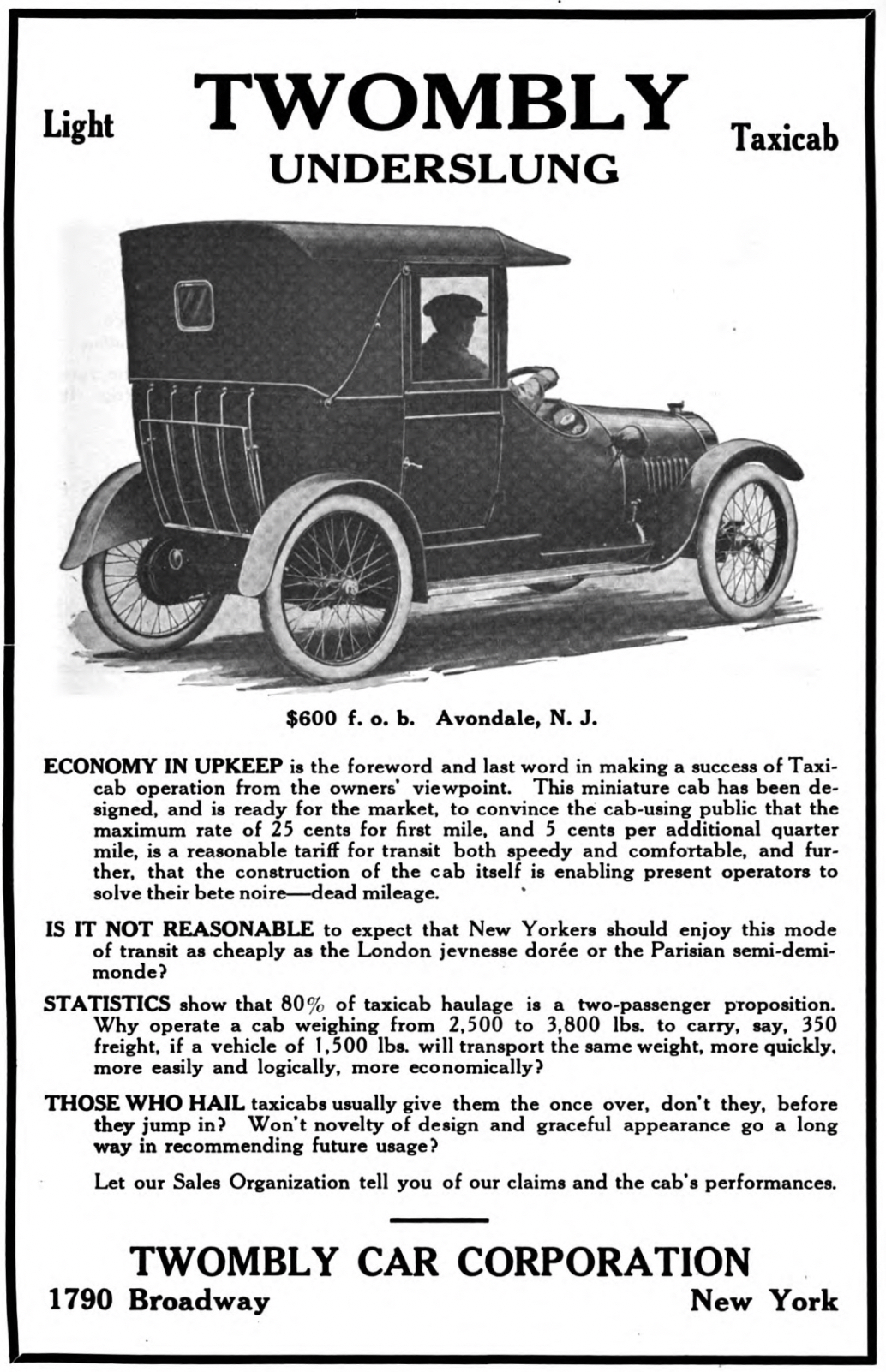
Twombly Taxicab (1915)

The Twombly was an American cyclecar manufactured by Driggs-Seabury between 1913 and 1915. The cars had water-cooled, four-cylinder engines, two seats in tandem, and an underslung body. Few of them are still in existence.

The car was designed by Willard Irving Twombly (1873-1953). His largest investor, Reverend David Stuart Dodge petitioned for bankruptcy in 1915 claiming he was owed $428,238 by the Twombly group of companies for loans and interest. Shortly after this, Twombly became involved in an expensive divorce case and was eventually jailed following accusations of bigamy and misconduct.
