= Ace (1920 automobile) =

Defunct American motor vehicle manufacturer

Apex Motor Car Co.; Apex Motor Corp.
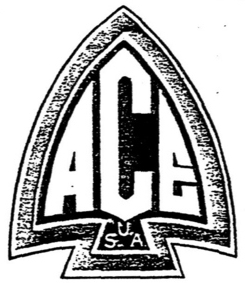
- Type: Automobile Manufacturing
- Industry: Automotive
- Founded: 1920
- Founder: FE Earnest
- Defunct: 1923
- Fate: sold and closed
- Headquarters: Ypsilanti, Michigan, United States
- Area served: United States
- Key people: Harry T. Hanover, Fred M. Guy, Otto W. Heinz
- Products: Vehicles; Automotive parts Bus coachwork

The Ace was an American-assembled car made in Ypsilanti, Michigan by the Apex Motor Car Company, which was reorganized as the Apex Motor Corporation in 1921. The initial batch of cars assembled was sent to Seattle, Washington dealer F. E. Earnest, who had the idea for the Ace after he was unable to secure a steady supply of new cars for his dealership.

The most interesting feature of the Ace was the Guy Disc-Valve motor, created by engineer Fred M. Guy, and Otto W. Heinz. Initially, it was prepared as a four-cylinder engine for production in the Hackett, but the company folded before it was ready.

In April, 1921, Guy and Heinz left the Apex Motor Corporation, with the support of Apex, to found the Guy Disc Valve Motor Co. in Ypsilanti. In mid-1921, a Model H tourer with a conventional Herschell-Spillman straight-6 was added, with a selling price of $2,000. The man at the helm at Apex was by now Harry T. Hanover. In 1922, the Guy engine was gone. The Model F Pup was added to the range, fitted with a conventional 4-cylinder Gray-Bell engine, and priced at $1295. It was sold beside the Model L Scout with a smaller than previous Hershell-Spillmann straight-six engine, and the new top-of-the-line Model C Combat with a 340 c.i. Continental Six engine. The sixes ranged in price from $2260 to $3150.

Most Ace cars were tourings, with a few roadsters, and a 4/5 passenger coupe-sedan with a custom-built look. The Combat line also included an attractive speedster in the Kissel Gold Bug pattern.

Apex was initially involved in the Diamond Cab project, which also included Gray Motor Corp., and Guy Disc Valve Motor Co. Within a few months, these plans became obsolete as Diamond Cab got new owners, resulting in the cab built by Elcar, and another cab built by the Driggs Ordnance & Manufacturing Corp.

Ace automobile production ended with the 1922 model year. Total production was 256 cars. Apex Corp. was sold to the American Motor Truck Company in Newark, Ohio, in 1922. For a short time, Apex built bus bodies here, but soon closed forever.

== Ace model overview ==
Year	Model name(s)	Cyl.	Displacement c.i. / cm^{3}	Power bhp / kW	Engine	Wheelbase in / mm	Coachwork	Price
1920	Six; Model T	S6		57 / 42,5	Guy Disc Valve	115 / 2921	Touring	
1921	Rotary Six; Model G	S6		57 / 42,5	Guy Disc Valve	123 / 3124	Touring	
1921	Rotary Six; Model G	S6		57 / 42,5	Guy Disc Valve	123 / 3124	Coupé	
1921	Six; Model H	S6	288.6; 4730	68 / 50,7	Herschell-Spillman	117 / 2972	Touring	US$2050
1921	Six; Model L	S6	248,9; 4078	59 / 44,0	Herschell-Spillman	117 / 2972	Touring; 5 Sitze	
1921	Six	S6	248,9; 4078	59 / 44,0	Herschell-Spillman	117 / 2972	Coupé-Sedan; 4-5 Sitze	
1922	Pub Model F 34-40	S4	192,4; 3153	43 / 32,1	Gray-Bell	114 / 2896	Touring; 5 Sitze	US$1295
1922	Pub Model F 34-40	S4	192,4; 3153	43 / 32,1	Gray-Bell	114 / 2896	Roadster; 2 Sitze	US$1295
1922	Pub Model F	S4	192,4; 3153	43 / 32,1	Gray-Bell	114 / 2896	Coupé-Sedan; 4-5 Sitze	US$1295
1922	Scout Model L 30-60	R6	248,9; 4078	59 / 44,0	Herschell-Spillman	117 / 2972	Touring; 5 Sitze	US$2260
1922	Scout Model L 30-60	S6	248,9; 4078	59 /44,0	Herschell-Spillman	117 / 2972	Roadster; 2 Sitze	US$2260
1922	35-70	S6	288.6; 4730		Herschell-Spillman	117 / 2972	Coupé-Sedan	
1922	Combat Model C 35-80	S6	340,6; 5582	77 / 57,4	Continental	120 / 3048	Touring; 5 Sitze	US$2975
1922	Combat Model C 35-80	S6	340,6; 5582	77 / 57,4	Continental	120 / 3048	Roadster; 2 Sitze	US$2975
1922	Combat Model C 35-80	S6	340,6; 5582	77 / 57,4	Continental	120 / 3048	Speedster; 3 Sitze	US$3150

The 1921 Model L and 1922 35-70 are mentioned by a single source. While the L appears a smaller companion to the Model H, the 35-70 possibly was nothing more than a renamed 1920 Model H Coupe-Sedan.

There is no existing Ace automobile known, however the Ypsilanti Automotive Heritage Museum offered a $5000 reward for evidence that directs to such a car. Although the museum continues to search for a surviving Ace, the reward expired in 2003 with the death of museum co-founder Skip Ungrodt.

== Gallery ==
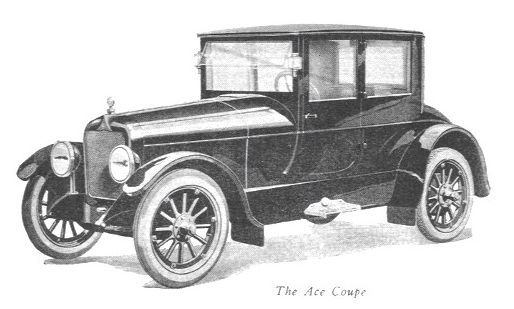
1921 Ace Rotary Six Model G Coupé

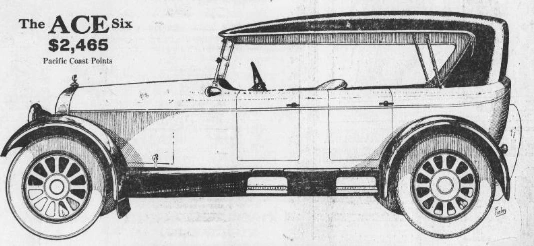
1921 Ace Six Model H

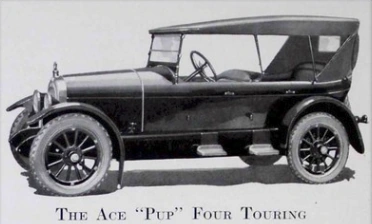
1922 Ace Pub Model F 34-40 Touring

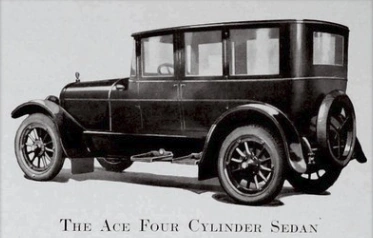
1922 Ace Pub Model F Coupé-Sedan 4-5 Sitze

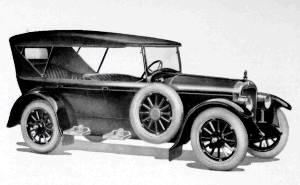
1922 Ace Combat Model C 35-80 Touring 5 Sitze

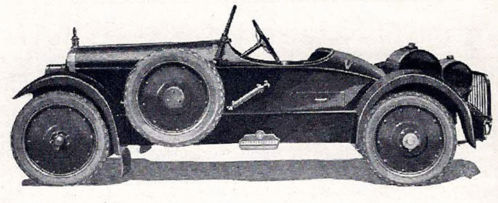
1922 Ace Combat Model C 35-80 Speedster 3 Sitze

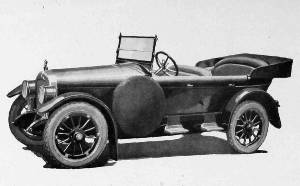
1922 Ace Scout Model L 30-60 Touring 5 Sitze

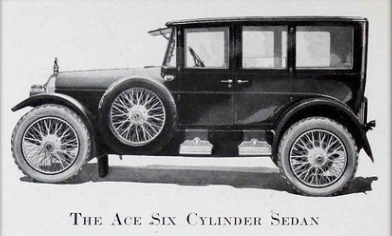
1922 Ace 35-70 Coupé-Sedan

== See also ==
- Vintage car
