= Driggs (automobile) =

Automobile built by Driggs Ordnance & Manufacturing Corporation

The Driggs was an automobile manufactured by the Driggs Ordnance & Manufacturing Corporation of New Haven, Connecticut between 1921 and 1923.

The Model D was powered by a 4-cylinder engine of the company's own design, and had a wheelbase of 104 inches (2640mm). The following models and prices were offered for sale:

- Tourer - $1275
- Roadster - $1275
- Sedan - $1975

For 1923 a Coupe was added to the range, selling for $1675. Although the Model D was advertised with the slogan "Built With the Precision of Ordnance", sales were probably not more than 150 vehicles. From 1923 the Model D was built for the taxi market until 1925.
