= BL 6-inch gun Mk V =

Armstrong BL 6-inch 30 calibre gun
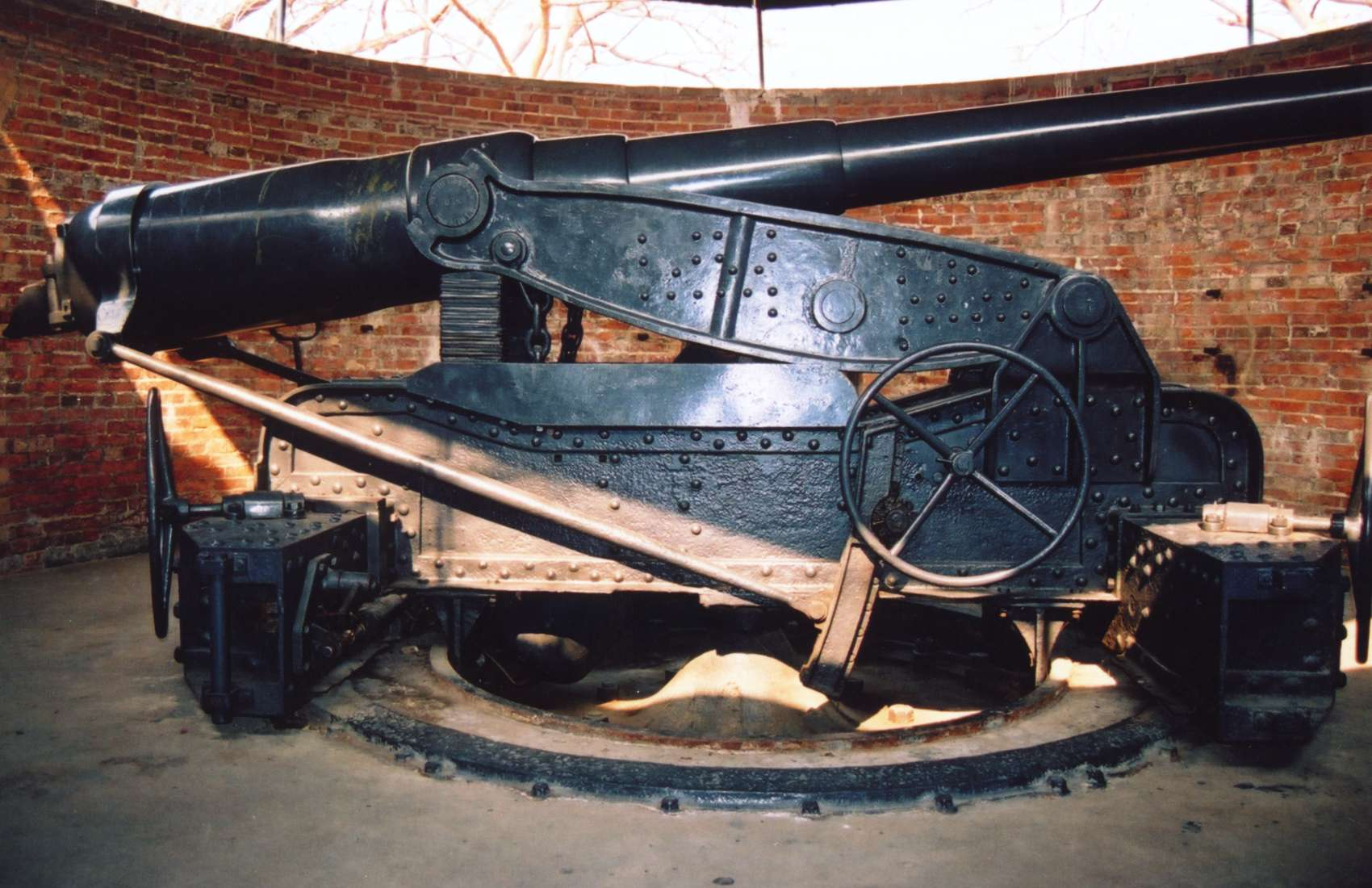
- Disappearing gun at Fort Chulachomklao, Thailand
- Type: Coast defence gun
- Place of origin: United Kingdom

Service history
- In service: 1884 - 1945
- Used by: United Kingdom; Australian Colonies; New Zealand; Siam; Romania

Production history
- Designer: Elswick Ordnance Company (EOC)
- Manufacturer: EOC
- Unit cost: £3,400

Specifications
- Mass: 5 tons barrel & breech
- Barrel length: 183.5 inches (4,661 mm) bore (30.58 calibres); 192 inches (4,877 mm) bore and chamber (32 calibres)
- Shell: 100 pounds (45.36 kg)
- Calibre: 6-inch (152.4 mm)
- Breech: 3 motion interrupted screw. Elswick cup obturation
- Muzzle velocity: 1,890 feet per second (576 m/s)
- Maximum firing range: 8,000 yards (7,300 m); 8,530 yards (7,800 m) (Romanian service)

The BL 6 inch gun Mk V (Note: Mk V = Mark 5. Britain used Roman numerals to designate Marks (models) of ordnance until after World War II. Hence this was the fifth model of BL 6-inch gun in British service.) was an early Elswick Ordnance Company breech-loading naval gun originally designed to use the old gunpowder propellants. They were used for coast defence around the British Empire.

== Description and service ==
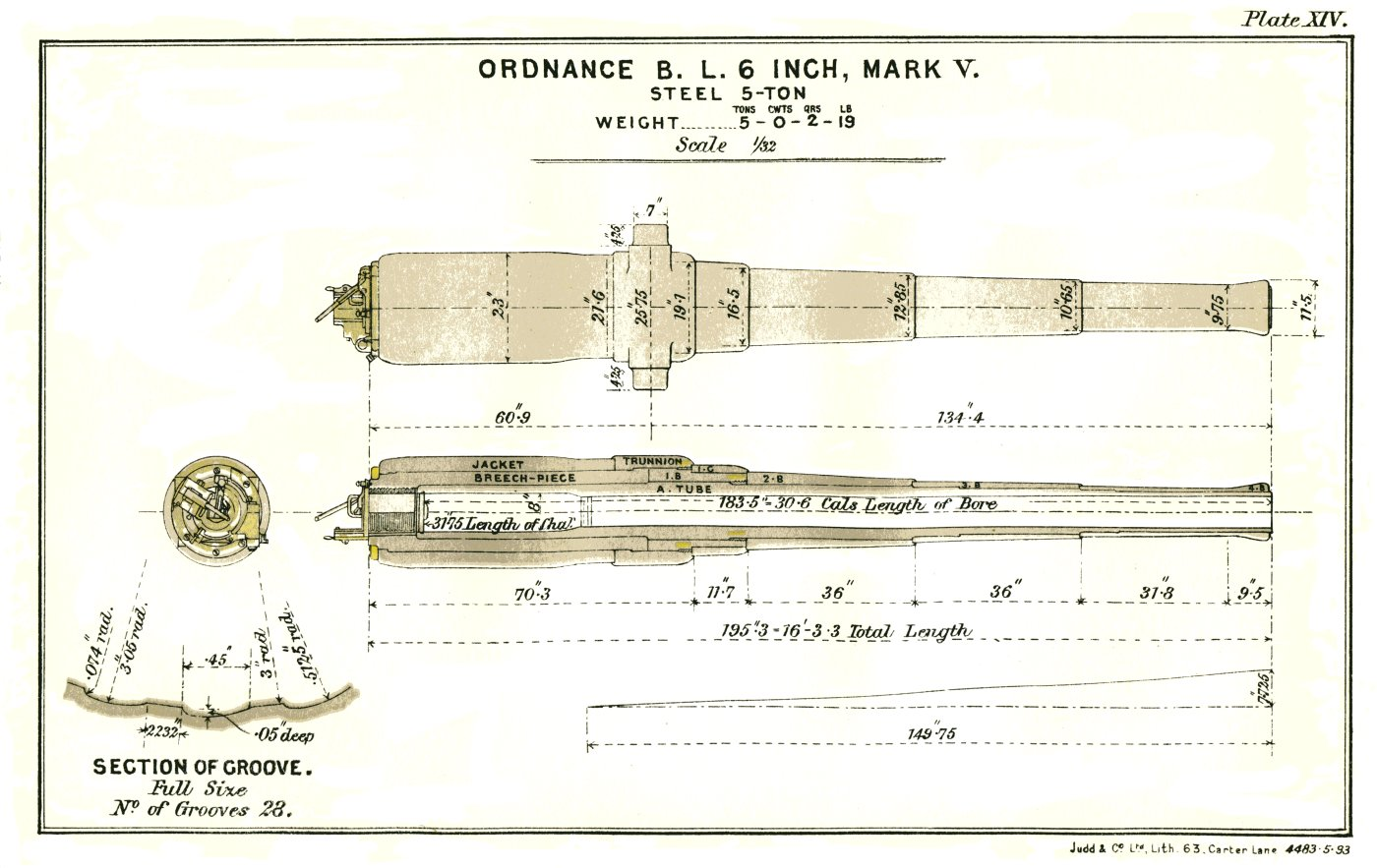
Gun construction and rifling diagram

This was an Elswick Ordnance export design, completely different from and longer (30-calibres, 183.5 inch bore) than the contemporary 26-calibres British naval service 6-inch Mk III, IV and VI guns designed by the Royal Gun Factory, although it fired the same 100-pound projectiles. The gun was of a complex all-steel built-up construction, of a steel A-tube surrounded by multiple steel hoops, breech-piece and jacket.

Several were acquired by the British government for coast defence in the UK and were given the designation 6-inch gun Mark V. The breech fittings and firing mechanism were modified in British service to standardize them with the British service guns, Mark IV and VI. The breech-screw was locked by turning to the left, unlike standard service guns made by the Royal Gun Factory, which all locked to the right. Rifling consisted of 28 grooves of the polygroove "Elswick section" type, increasing from 0 to 1 turn in 30 calibres (i.e. 1 turn in 180 inches) at the muzzle.

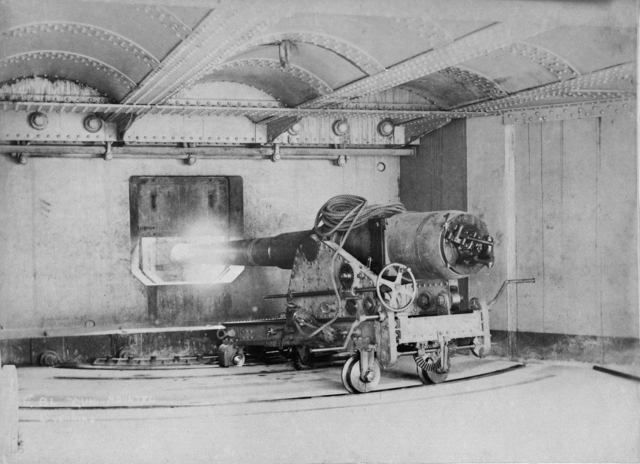
Mk V in the upper casemate battery at Georges Head, Sydney, 1892

They were also exported for use as coast-defence guns in Hong Kong, New Zealand, Australian colonies and Siam (Thailand), typically as disappearing guns.

Romania purchased 10 L/32 guns and used them during the First World War. The Romanian guns had a greater range (7,800 meters).

== QFC conversion ==
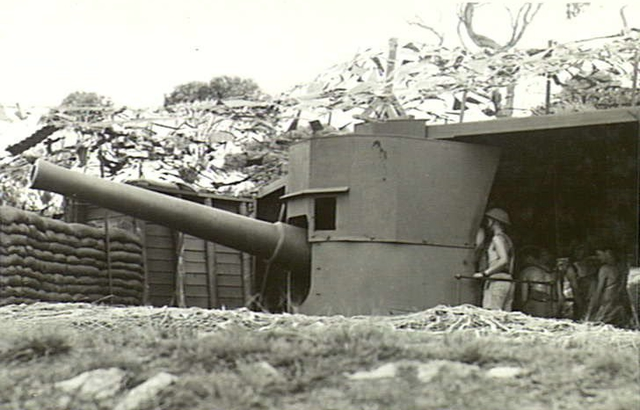
QFC gun, Albany defences, March 1943

During the 1890s, when the new "QF" technology of loading propellant charges in brass cases to increase the rate of fire was in favour, 4 guns were returned from New South Wales, Australia to the UK to be converted to QF.

2 of the resulting QFC guns are known to have been still in commission until 1945, in the Princess Royal Fortress defending the port of Albany, Western Australia.

== Image gallery ==
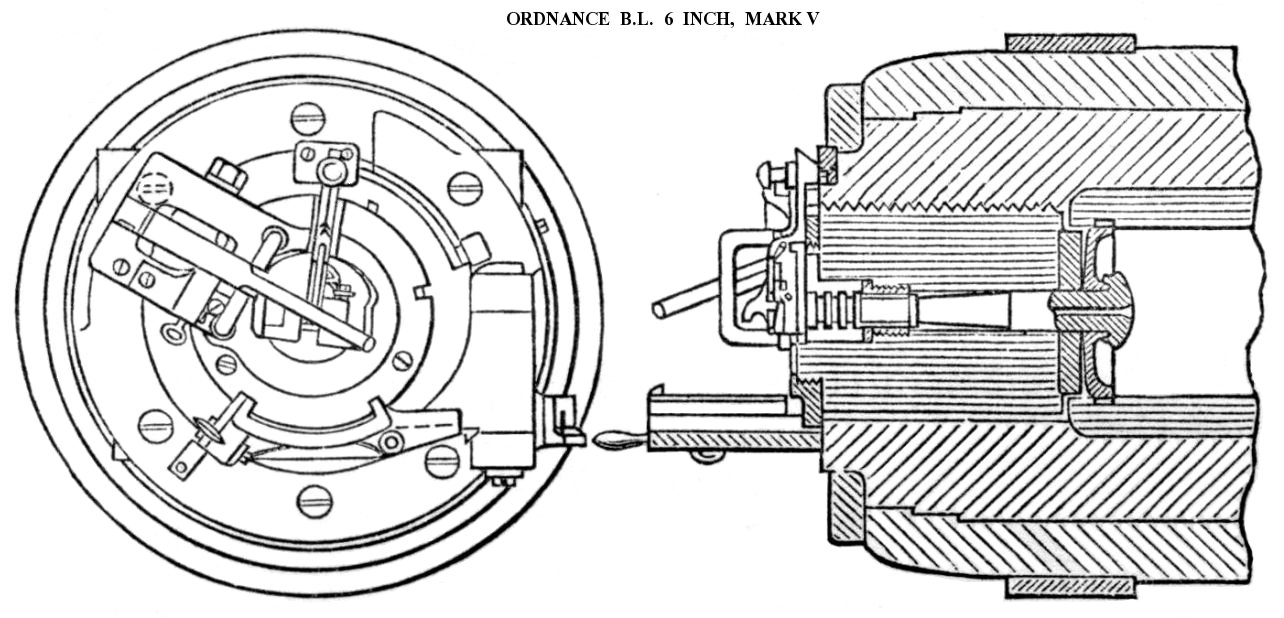
Mk V Elswick breech mechanism

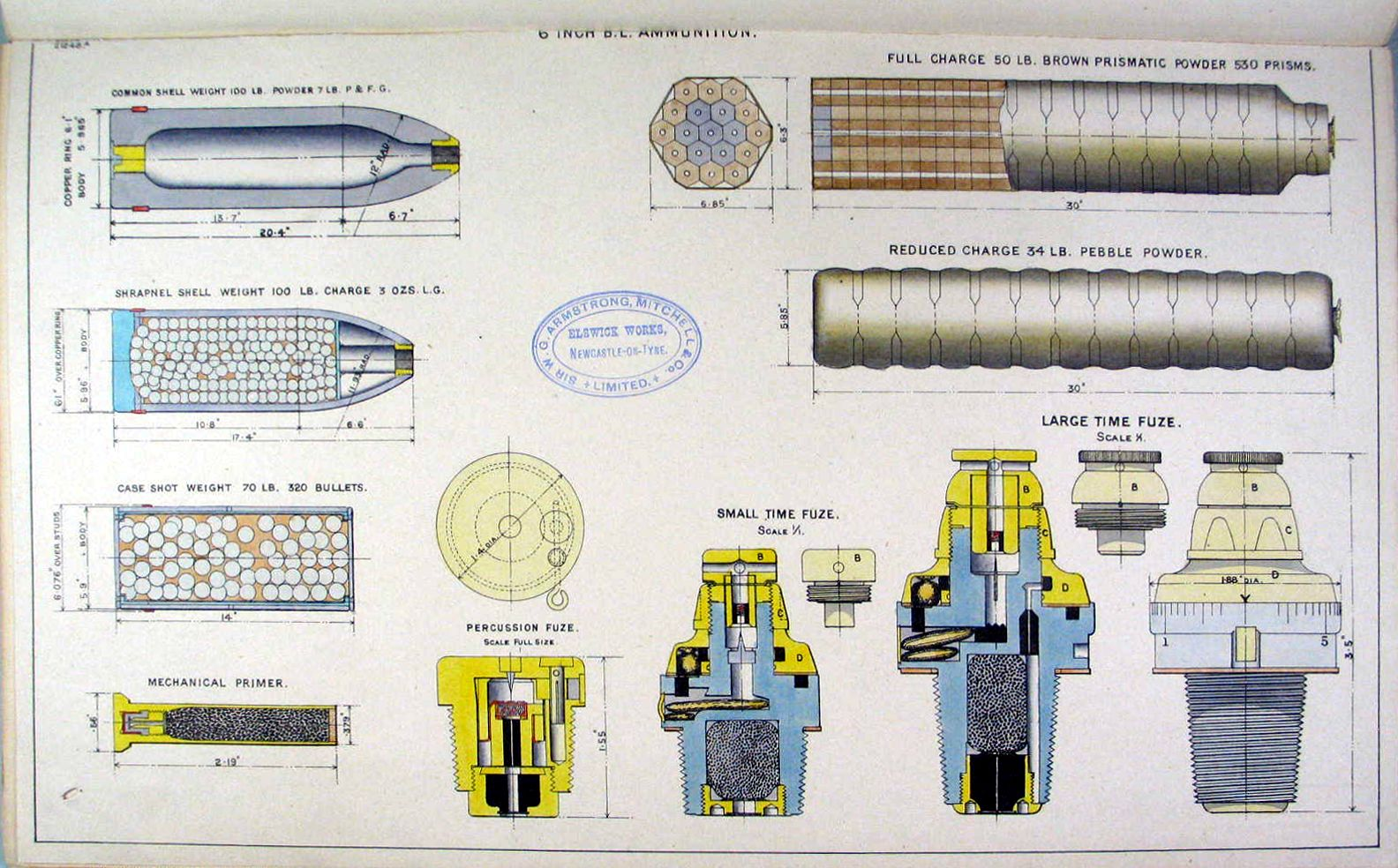
Ammunition

== See also ==
- List of coastal artillery

== Surviving examples ==
- 7 disappearing guns at Chulachomklao Fort, Bangkok, Thailand. See File:Armstrong cannon, Chulachomklao fort.jpg
- A Mk V gun on reproduction disappearing mount at Fort Lytton, near Brisbane, Queensland, Australia. See also
- Mk V disappearing gun restored in 1998 at Taiaroa Head, Dunedin, New Zealand.
- Armstrong Mk V gun, North Shore, Auckland New Zealand. Formerly at Fort Bastion
- An unrestored Mk V disappearing gun at Fort Jervois, Ripapa Island, New Zealand

== Bibliography ==
- Text Book of Gunnery, 1887. LONDON : PRINTED FOR HIS MAJESTY'S STATIONERY OFFICE, BY HARRISON AND SONS, ST. MARTIN'S LANE
- "Treatise on the Construction and Manufacture of Ordnance in the British Service", War Office, UK, 1893.
- Text Book of Gunnery, 1902. LONDON : PRINTED FOR HIS MAJESTY'S STATIONERY OFFICE, BY HARRISON AND SONS, ST. MARTIN'S LANE
