= Michael Herrick =

New Zealand flying ace

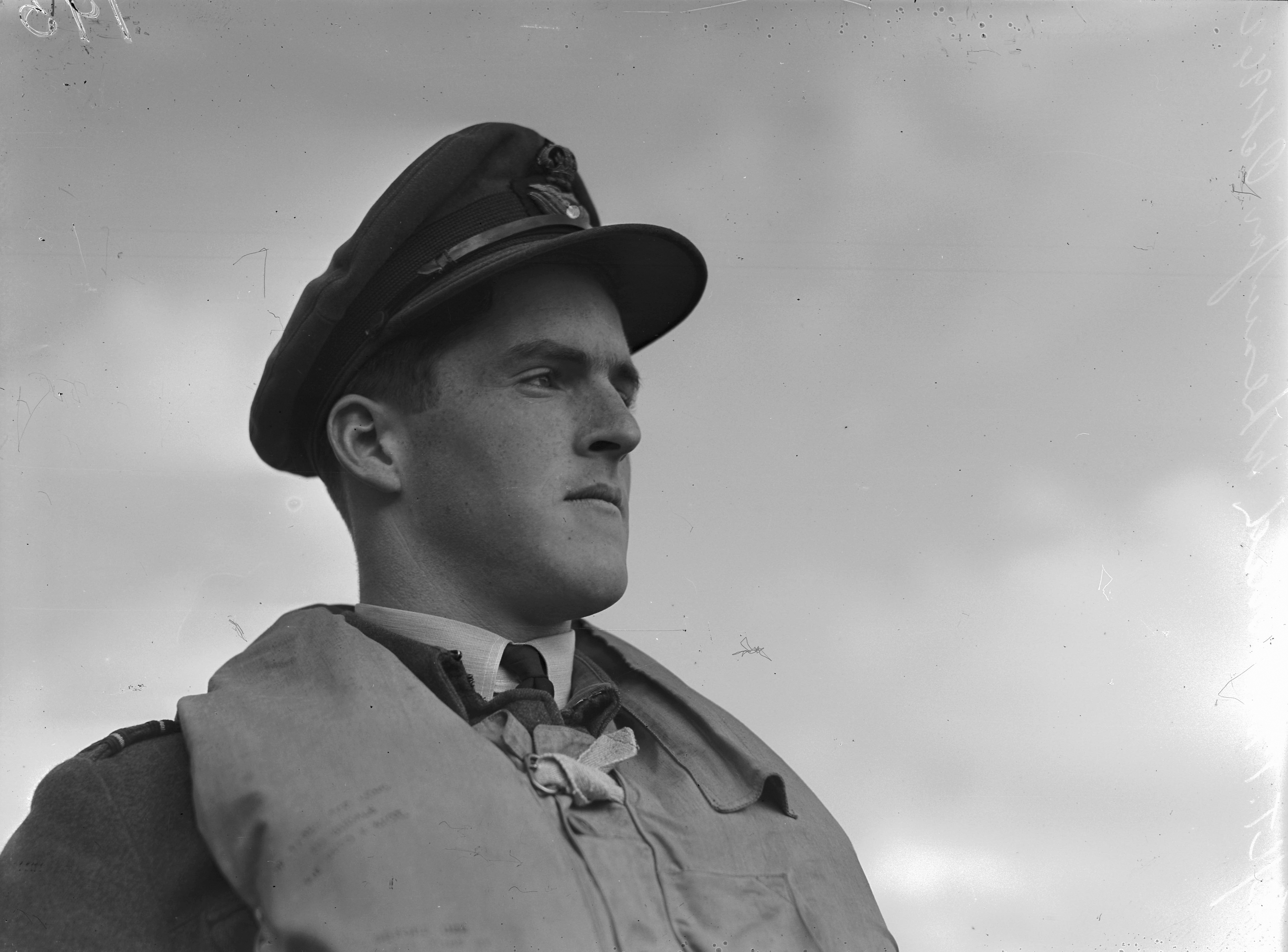
- Born: 5 May 1921; Hastings, New Zealand
- Died: 16 June 1944 (aged 23); Denmark
- Military career
- Allegiance: New Zealand
- Branch: Royal Air Force
- Service years: 1939–1944 †
- Rank: Squadron Leader
- Commands: No. 15 Squadron RNZAF
- Conflicts: Second World War; Battle of Britain; New Georgia campaign; Battle of the Treasury Islands
- Awards: Distinguished Flying Cross & Bar; Air Medal (United States)

Michael James Herrick, DFC & Bar (5 May 1921 – 16 June 1944) was a New Zealand flying ace of the Royal Air Force (RAF) during the Second World War. He is credited with having shot down at least six enemy aircraft.

Born in Hastings, Herrick joined the RAF in 1939. During the Battle of Britain he flew Bristol Blenheims on night operations with No. 25 Squadron, destroying three German bombers. He was awarded the Distinguished Flying Cross (DFC) for his actions during the battle. In late 1941, Herrick was sent to New Zealand on secondment to the Royal New Zealand Air Force to take command of its new No. 15 Squadron. With the squadron he flew two operational tours in the Pacific, including several missions around Guadalcanal, and destroyed a number of Japanese aircraft. In 1944, having been awarded a bar to his DFC, he returned to England to resume service with the RAF and was posted to No. 305 Polish Bomber Squadron, which operated the de Havilland Mosquito fighter-bomber, as one of its flight commanders. Herrick was killed during a daylight raid on a German airfield at Aalborg in Denmark. In recognition of his services in the Pacific, he was posthumously awarded the United States Air Medal.

== Early life ==
Michael James Herrick was born in Hastings, New Zealand, on 5 May 1921, one of five sons of Edward Jasper Herrick and his wife, Ethne Rose née Smith. He was first educated at Hurworth School in Wanganui before going onto Wanganui Collegiate School. While still at school, he took flying lessons and soon earned his pilot's licence from the Hawke's Bay and East Coast Aero Club. In 1938, he gained a cadetship for the Royal Air Force (RAF). This involved attending its college at Cranwell, and he travelled to England on RMS Rangitiki the following year to commence his training.

== Second World War ==
The outbreak of the Second World War forced Herrick's cadetship, originally scheduled to run for two years, to be consolidated by the RAF. He was commissioned as a pilot officer on 7 March 1940 and was posted to No. 25 Squadron, which was stationed at North Weald and operated Bristol Blenheims. At the time he joined the squadron, it was involved in patrols over the North Sea, providing protection for convoys transiting the British coast. During Operation Dynamo, it helped escort the evacuation fleet to and from Dunkirk and carried out patrols along the Dutch and Belgian coast.

=== Battle of Britain ===
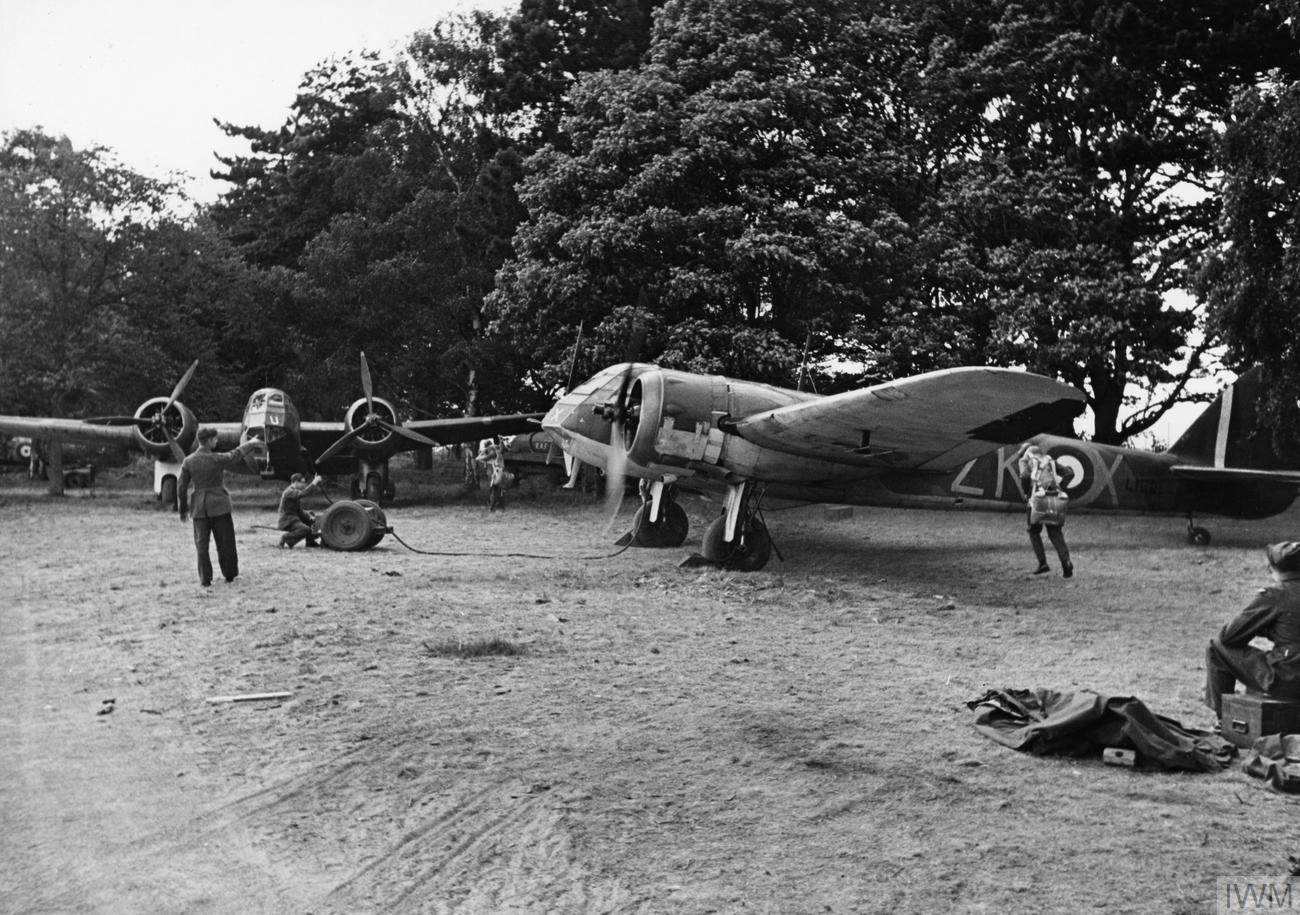
A Bristol Blenheim of No. 25 Squadron at Martlesham Heath, July 1940

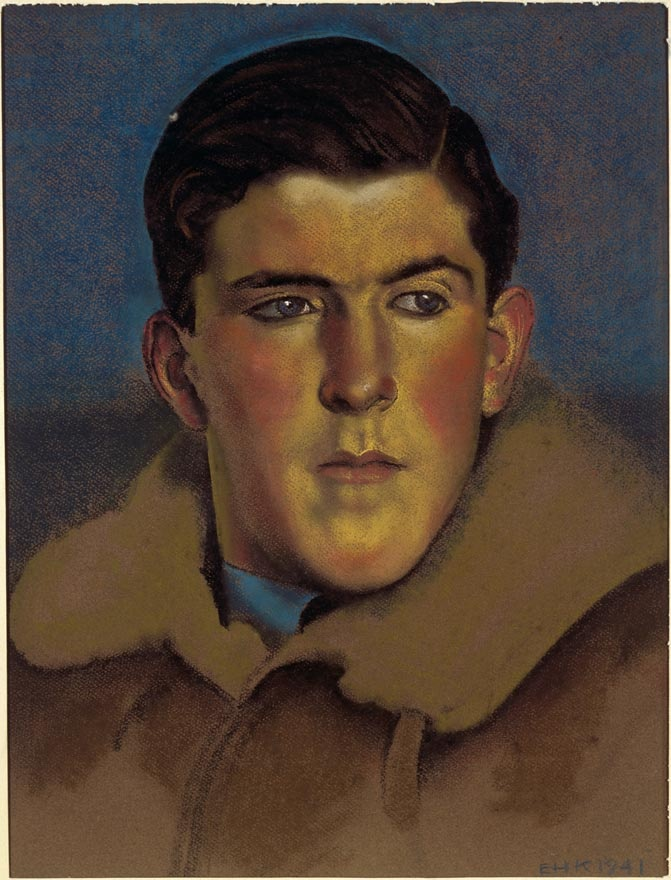
Portrait of Herrick, painted by Eric Kennington in 1941

Although No. 25 Squadron's aircraft had been intended for light bombing, in June it was moved to Martlesham Heath to operate in a night fighting role. The Blenheims were equipped with airborne radar, which Herrick helped to test. The squadron's switch in role coincided with an increase in the Luftwaffe's nightly bombing raids on London. On the night of 4/5 September 1940, despite his aircraft's radar set malfunctioning, Herrick spotted a Heinkel He 111 bomber caught in some of Anti-Aircraft Command's searchlights and shot it down. Within minutes he located and destroyed another bomber, a Dornier Do 17, exhausting his ammunition in doing so. These destroyed aircraft were the first aerial victories of the war to be credited to one of the squadron's pilots. In recognition of his successes, he was later awarded the Distinguished Flying Cross (DFC). The published citation read:

During an interception patrol on the night of 4th September, 1940, Pilot Officer Herrick spotted two enemy aircraft and destroyed them both. In his attack against the second aircraft he succeeded in closing to within 30 yards and it fell in pieces under his fire.

— London Gazette, No. 34951, 24 September 1940.

On the night of 13/14 September, while flying a patrol north of London, he was directed by his radar to a He 111. Climbing up behind the bomber he opened fire, prompting its crew to jettison its bombload. He continued his attack and the German aircraft went down out of control and exploded, but not before its rear gunner caused minor damage to Herrick's aircraft. He had accounted for three of the four German aircraft destroyed by Fighter Command on night operations during September. No. 25 Squadron soon began converting to Bristol Beaufighters, and in one of these aircraft, operating from Wittering, Herrick possibly destroyed a bomber in December.

In March 1941 Herrick was promoted to flying officer and two months later was credited with damaging a Junkers Ju 88 bomber near Hull. He destroyed a Ju 88 on 22 June while on patrol over the Midlands. He was guided in its general direction by ground control and then picked it up on his onboard radar. Spotting the German bomber below him, he opened fire with his guns, setting the Ju 88 ablaze. It dived into the ground and exploded.

=== Secondment ===
In October 1941, Herrick was seconded to the Royal New Zealand Air Force (RNZAF) and by the end of the year was back in the country of his birth. He spent a period of time as an instructor at the No. 2 Flying Training School at Woodbourne and then Ohakea. Promoted to flight lieutenant in March 1942, he was posted to the RNZAF's No. 15 Squadron three months later. The squadron had just been formed and, based at Whenuapai, was training with P-40 Kittyhawks. After a few months it was sent to Tonga and began operating P-40s that had been recently used by the United States Army Air Force's No. 68 Pursuit Squadron, with responsibility for the air defence of the island. In February 1943, the squadron moved to Espiritu Santo, the main island of Vanuatu, assuming a similar defence role there for a few weeks before, in April, being dispatched to Guadalcanal in the Solomon Islands. Its role there was to carry out local patrols, fly as escorts for bombers, and provide cover for American shipping convoys. By this time Herrick had been promoted squadron leader and was in charge of the unit; the original commanding officer had been killed in a flying accident.

The squadron's initial encounter with the Japanese took place while escorting a Lockheed Hudson on 6 May, when Herrick and his wingman shared in the destruction of a Nakajima A6M2-N "Rufe" floatplane. This is acknowledged to be the first Japanese aircraft shot down in the Pacific by fighters of the RNZAF. A few days later he took part in an escort mission, leading a flight of eight P-40s accompanying a force of Douglas SBD Dauntless light bombers. The P-40s made an initial strafing attack on a Japanese destroyer and, leaving it to the SBDs to finish off, then attacked landing craft disembarking soldiers onto a nearby island. On 7 June, he was involved in a large dogfight that took place when a force of over 100 Allied fighters, including twelve P-40s from No. 15 Squadron, encountered around 50 Japanese Mitsubishi A6M Zeroes near the Russell Islands. On this occasion, Herrick shot down a Zero.

In late June, No. 15 Squadron completed its first operational tour and returned to New Zealand for a rest. It was back in Guadalcanal to commence its second tour in September, again flying as escorts for bombing missions and covering convoys. On 1 October, Herrick shared in the destruction of an Aichi D3A "Val" dive bomber that was attacking a convoy transporting troops of the 3rd New Zealand Division to Vella Lavella. Herrick's kill was one of seven Japanese aircraft shot down by the squadron that day. He also damaged a second Val. In late October, No. 15 Squadron moved to Ondonga in New Georgia; it was to support operations against the Treasury Islands and Bougainville.

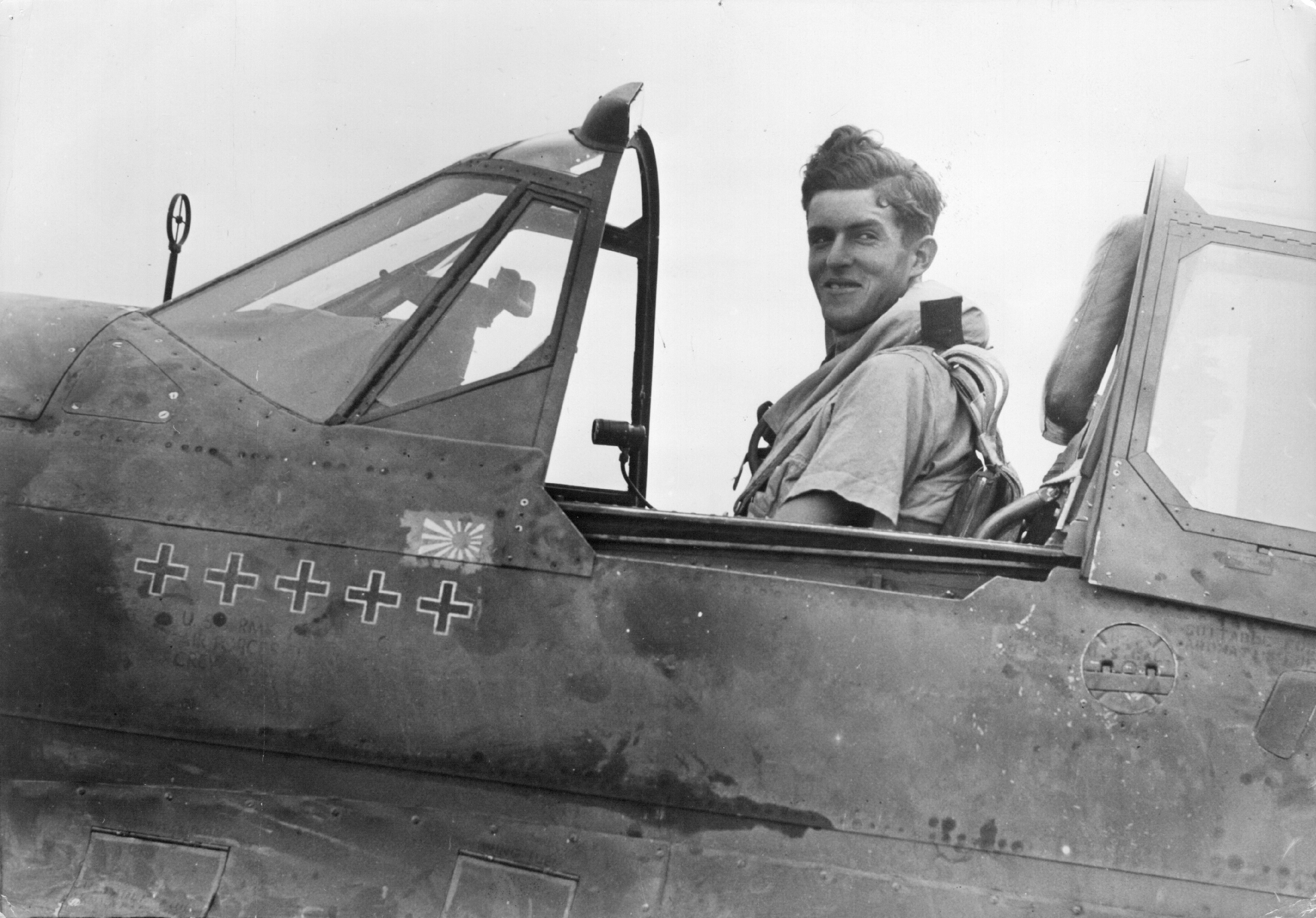
Herrick sitting in the cockpit of his Kittyhawk, Guadalcanal

On 27 October, during the landings at the Treasury Islands by New Zealand infantry and supporting troops, the squadron flew covering missions throughout the day. In doing so, they intercepted a force of around 80 Japanese aircraft attempting to attack barges landing supplies and shot down four fighters, with Herrick accounting for one of them, a Zero. The squadron also flew missions protecting the beachhead on Bougainville throughout November. The following month and with his secondment to the RNZAF nearing its end, Herrick relinquished command of the squadron and left to return to New Zealand. He was subsequently awarded a bar to his DFC; this was announced in the London Gazette on 22 February 1944. The citation noted that it was for "gallantry displayed in flying operations against the enemy in the Solomon Islands".

=== Return to the RAF ===
In January 1944, Herrick, returning to service with the RAF, embarked for England, via Canada, travelling on a troopship while in charge of 300 RNZAF personnel who were proceeding to Edmonton for flight training. Once in England, Herrick was posted to No. 305 Polish Bomber Squadron, based at Lasham, where he took command of one of its flights.

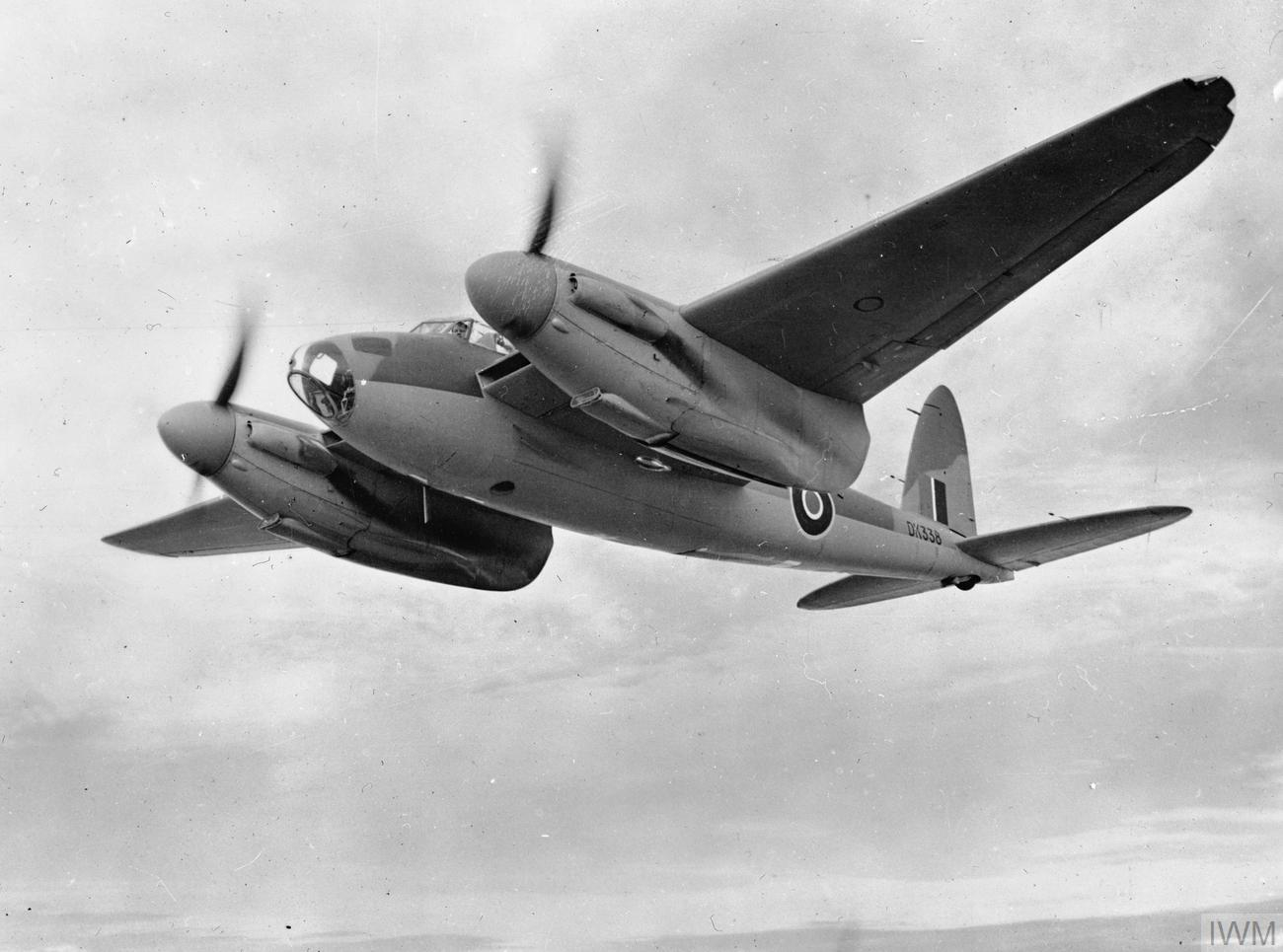
When Herrick was with No. 305 Polish Bomber Squadron he flew a de Havilland Mosquito, like the one shown here

At the time he joined the squadron, it operated de Havilland Mosquito fighter-bombers on nighttime missions to mainland Europe, targeting enemy airfields and launching sites for V-1 rockets, but by the middle of the year it was also flying daytime operations. On 16 June 1944, Herrick and his Polish navigator flew a mission during the day to German-occupied Denmark, targeting a Luftwaffe airfield at Aalborg. They were accompanied by Wing Commander John Braham in his own Mosquito, flying as a pair until Braham separated to proceed to his objective. As Herrick approached the Jutland coast, his Mosquito was attacked by a Focke-Wulf Fw 190 flown by Leutnant Robert Spreckels. Although Herrick and his navigator bailed out when their aircraft was shot down, they were too low for their parachutes to open and were killed. Herrick landed in the sea and his body washed ashore two weeks later. Spreckels later shot down Braham, who became a prisoner of war. Interrogated by Spreckels, he was reportedly advised that Herrick had made a good account of himself before being shot down.

Herrick is credited with shooting down six aircraft and sharing in two other aircraft destroyed and two damaged. He is buried in the Commonwealth War Graves Commission's section of the Frederikshavn Cemetery in Denmark.

The month after Herrick's death, it was announced that he was to be awarded the United States Air Medal for his services in the Solomon Islands; the medal was formally presented to his parents at Wellington in June 1945 by Captain Lloyd Gray, the naval attache at the United States Embassy. The citation specifically noted his exploits in the Solomon Islands area during the period of May to June 1943. Two of his brothers also served in the RAF; both died on flying operations in the early years of the war. An aunt, Ruth Herrick, played a key role in the establishment of the Women's Royal New Zealand Naval Service.
