= Lorelle Corbin =

New Zealand clerk and naval officer

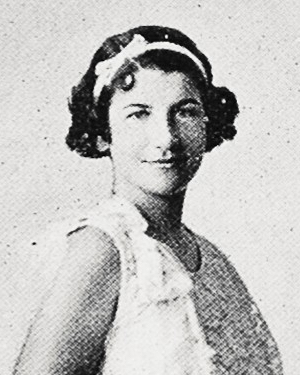
- Corbin as a debutante in 1934
- Born: Lorelle Henderson Corbin; 3 June 1916; Adelaide, Australia
- Died: 13 March 1995 (aged 78); Wellington, New Zealand
- Military career
- Allegiance: New Zealand
- Branch: Women's Royal New Zealand Naval Service
- Service years: 1942–1946; 1947–1963
- Rank: First Officer
- Commands: Women's Royal New Zealand Naval Service (1947–63)
- Conflicts: Second World War
- Awards: Member of the Order of the British Empire

Lorelle Henderson Corbin, MBE (3 June 1916 – 13 March 1995) was a New Zealand clerk and naval officer. Born in Adelaide in Australia, she moved to New Zealand with her family in 1925. During the Second World War, she served in the Women's Royal New Zealand Naval Service as a Wren. In 1947, she became director of the organisation, leading it until her retirement in 1963. She died in Wellington in 1995 at the age of 78.

== Early life ==
Lorelle Henderson Corbin was born in Adelaide in the state of South Australia, Australia, on 3 June 1916. Her father was Horace Corbin, a lecturer at the University of Adelaide. The Corbin family moved to New Zealand in 1925 when Horace took up a professorship in forestry at the University of Auckland. Educated at Diocesan High School for Girls, she became a clerk at New Zealand Tung Oil Corporation after completing her schooling.

== Second World War ==
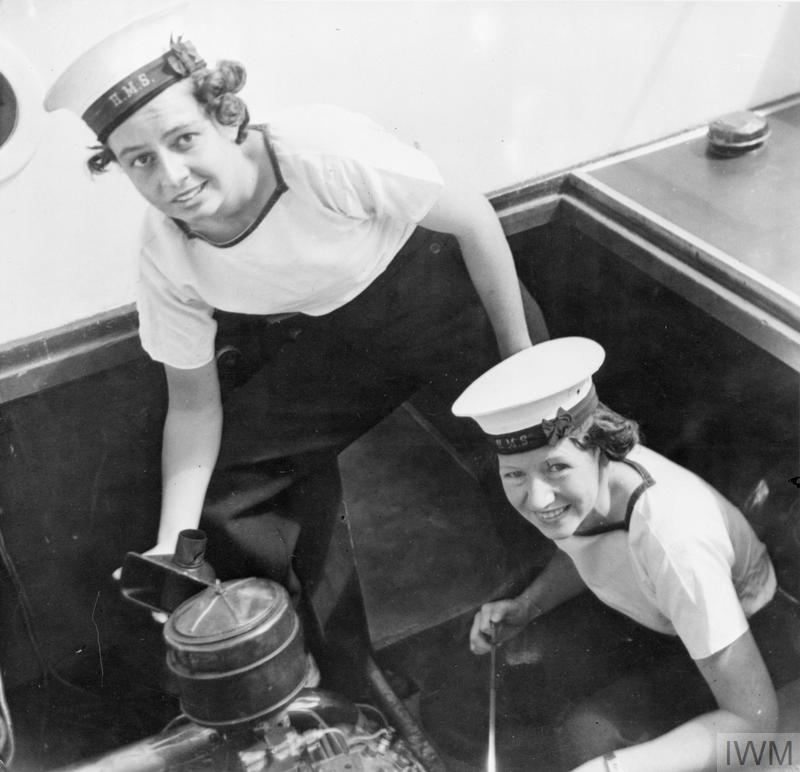
Two women of the WRNZNS servicing the engine of a barge

In April 1942, the Women's Royal New Zealand Naval Service (WRNZNS), its personnel becoming known as Wrens, was established for women wanting to enter naval service. Corbin, one of its earliest recruits, was stationed in Auckland as a clerk-typist. By September the following year she had been promoted to fourth officer and was assisting in the management of around 200 Wrens in the Auckland region. In contrast to most of the personnel under her charge, who were based at the barracks at the Devonport Naval Base, she lived in Remuera with her parents. In July 1945, she was selected for training in anticipation of service with the British Pacific Fleet but the posting never eventuated due to the end of the Second World War.

Posted to Wellington to serve as secretary to Commodore G.H. Faulkner, the chief of naval staff, Corbin assisted in the demobilisation of Royal New Zealand Navy (RNZN) personnel for much of 1946. After being sent to London as one of eleven Wrens to participate in the Victory Parade there in June 1946, she was discharged in September 1946 with the rank of third officer. The WRNZNS itself was disbanded soon afterwards.

== Reestablishment of the WRNZNS ==
Following the mutiny at Devonport Naval Base in April 1947, where several RNZN personnel left in protest at their working conditions, the WRNZNS was reestablished to help fill in the gap in manpower. Wrens could assume some of the onshore duties performed by RNZN personnel, freeing the men up for service at sea. Corbin was requested to lead the organisation. She faced some initial difficulties; Wrens were recruited on six-month contracts, since the RNZN believed the manpower shortage would only be temporary. It was not until 1950, when legislation was passed formally integrating the WRNZNS into the RNZN, that this situation was resolved.

By 1948, Corbin had been promoted to second officer and her work in the ongoing reestablishment of the WRNZNS was recognised by the naval secretary. Despite her efforts, the WRNZNS still continued to struggle to attract personnel, not helped by the high standards Corbin set for recruits and the generally high rate of employment that persisted in New Zealand throughout the 1950s and 1960s. Wrens were mainly employed in two locations, at the Philomel shore establishment and the Navy Office in Wellington, performing administration duties. She toured the country as part of the Naval Recruiting Board, seeking candidates for the service.

After attending the Coronation Parade in London for Elizabeth II in 1953, Corbin was promoted to first officer. She was now based in Wellington at the Navy Office as the director of the WRNZNS. She was appointed a Member of the Order of the British Empire in the 1956 Queen's Birthday Honours. She retired from the service in 1963. The number of serving Wrens during her period as director was never particularly high; in the 1960s there were less than 50 personnel.

== Later life ==
Shortly after leaving the WRNZNS, Corbin married John Lord in Auckland. The couple later lived in Wellington. Corbin retained an interest in the WRNZNS, being involved in the New Zealand Ex-Wrens Association and was present at the last parade of the organisation before it was dissolved in 1977; women were now able to serve in the RNZN. She died on 13 March 1995; her husband had predeceased her the previous year.
