= Geoffrey Fisken =

New Zealand fighter pilot

Geoffrey Bryson Fisken
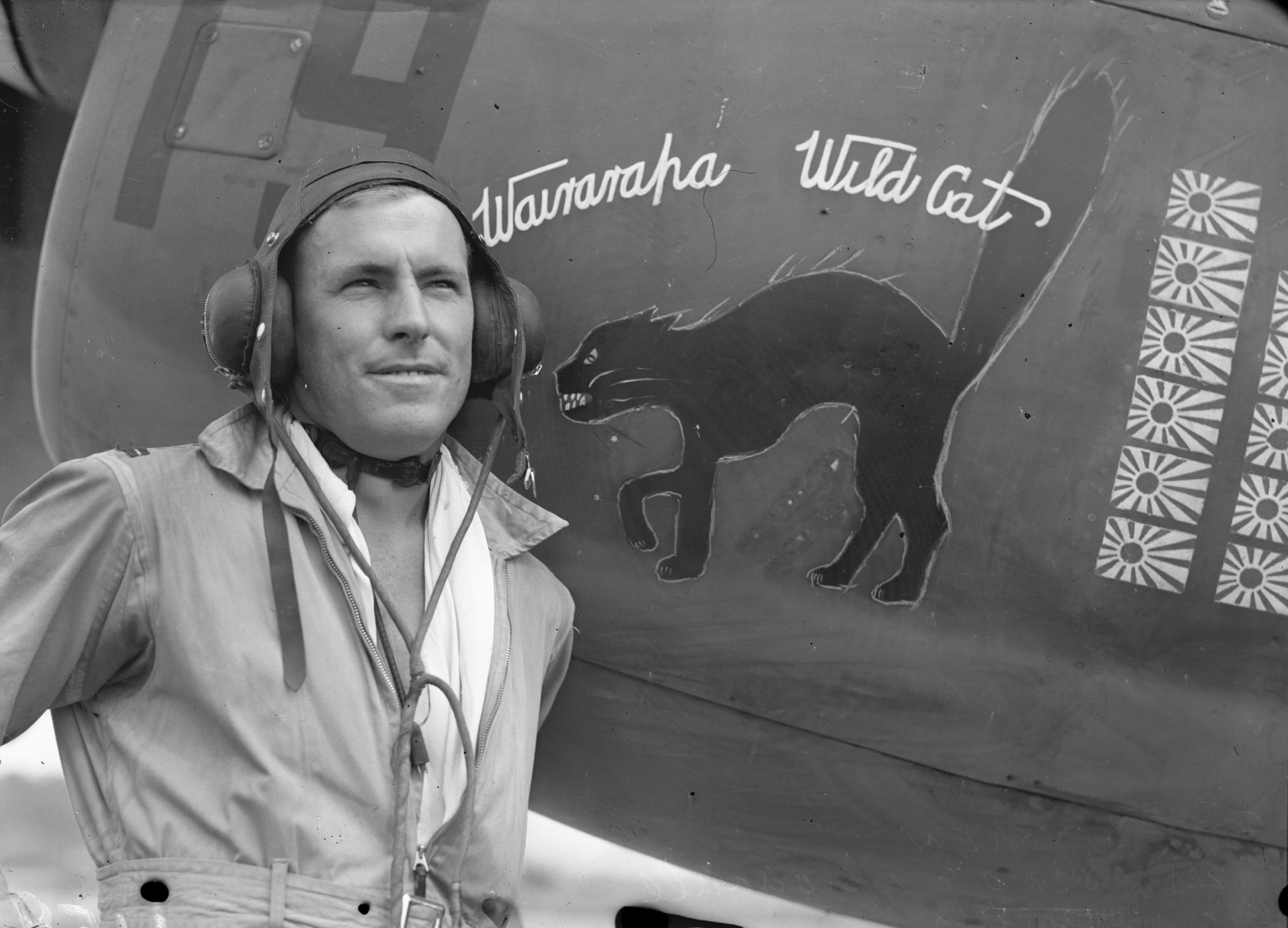
- Fisken with his P-40 Kittyhawk, which he named Wairarapa Wildcat
- Born: 17 February 1916; Gisborne, New Zealand
- Died: 12 June 2011 (aged 95); Rotorua, New Zealand
- Military career
- Allegiance: New Zealand
- Branch: Royal New Zealand Air Force
- Service years: 1940–1943
- Rank: Flying Officer
- Units: No. 243 Squadron (RAF); No. 453 Squadron (RAAF); No. 14 Squadron (RNZAF)
- Conflicts: Second World War; Malayan campaign; Solomon Islands campaign
- Awards: Distinguished Flying Cross

Geoffrey Fisken, DFC (17 February 1916 – 12 June 2011) was a New Zealand fighter pilot who was the British Commonwealth's leading air ace in the Pacific theatre of the Second World War. He is credited with shooting down eleven Japanese aircraft.

Born in Gisborne, Fisken was a shepherd when he joined the Royal New Zealand Air Force (RNZAF) in 1940. After his training was completed, he was sent to Singapore where he served briefly with the Royal Air Force's No. 67 Squadron before being posted to No. 243 Squadron where he flew Brewster Buffalo fighters. Following the entry of Japan into the Second World War in December 1941, he destroyed several aircraft during the Japanese invasion of British Malaya. Wounded in February 1942, he was repatriated to New Zealand. Upon recovery from his injuries, he was posted to the RNZAF's No. 14 Squadron which had been formed at Ohakea with Curtiss P-40 Kittyhawk fighters. He went with the squadron to the Solomon Islands and during its service there he shot down more Japanese aircraft. By August 1943, he was in poor health and repatriated to New Zealand that month. Awarded the Distinguished Flying Cross in September, he was released from the RNZAF on medical grounds at the end of the year. Much of the remainder of the rest of his life was spent farming at Masterton and Te Puke. He died on 12 June 2011 at the age of 95.

== Early life ==
Geoffrey Bryson Fisken, the youngest son of a farmer, was born in Gisborne, in New Zealand, on 17 February 1916. As a child he worked on the family farm and when his schooling was completed, he went to Ruakura Agricultural College before he moved to Masterton where he was a shepherd. Fisken, who had built a glider while in his teens, learnt to fly privately during the 1930s. Allegedly, on one occasion, he used an aircraft to round up sheep on his employer's farm.

== Second World War ==
In September 1939, at the outbreak of the Second World War Fisken volunteered for the Royal New Zealand Air Force (RNZAF), but was initially barred from enlisting. At the time in New Zealand, farming was a reserved occupation as it was considered vital for the war effort. It was not until March 1940 that Fisken was able to enlist, after convincing his employer to release him for service. Following this Fisken was accepted as a pilot and after completing his flying training, gained his 'wings' as a sergeant pilot in early 1941.

=== Singapore and Malaya ===
In February 1941, Fisken was posted to Singapore to join No. 205 Squadron, a Royal Air Force (RAF) unit which was operating flying boats at the time. When he arrived, however, he discovered that these machines were being transferred to the RNZAF's No. 5 Squadron, so Fisken was instead sent to complete a fighter conversion course on Brewster Buffalo fighters. He was then posted to the RAF's No. 67 Squadron. This was in the process of forming at Kallang using Buffaloes on lend lease from the United States, and became operational in June. Then, in October, it was sent to Burma. Fisken did not go with the unit and instead was posted to join No. 243 Squadron. This was another fighter squadron based at Kallang and, like his previous squadron, was equipped with Buffaloes and tasked with the aerial defence of Singapore. The all-metal monoplane Buffaloes were deemed not fit for service in Europe and were sent to Singapore for second-line duties by the RAF. Heavy, underpowered and equipped with a manual fuel pump system that had to be operated by the pilots, it was not comparable with the modern fighters used by the Japanese.

The Japanese invaded British Malaya on 8 December and two days later No. 243 Squadron was involved in the unsuccessful defence of HMS Prince of Wales and HMS Repulse. Fisken was flying one of two Buffaloes to arrive at the site of the sinking of the ships, describing the scene as "a grey metal bow sticking out of the sea, surrounded by an oil slick and many bodies". On 12 December, Fisken was part of a small detachment from No. 243 Squadron to briefly operate with an Australian squadron, No. 21 Squadron, flying from Ipoh, and returning to Singapore a few days later.

As the Japanese advanced down the Malay Peninsula, Singapore came under an increasing number of bombing raids, and No. 243 Squadron became increasingly committed to the defence of the city, often engaging formations of a hundred Japanese aircraft. On 12 January 1942, Fisken shot down a Nakajima Ki-27 fighter over Singapore. He claimed another fighter shot down two days later; initially deemed as probably destroyed, it was subsequently confirmed. On 17 January, he shot down two Mitsubishi G3M medium bombers, with a third probably destroyed, and four days later destroyed another fighter. In the intervening period he damaged another bomber.

By late January, No. 243 Squadron had lost the majority of its pilots and virtually all its aircraft. As a result, it was merged with the Australian No. 453 Squadron, which continued to operate, along with the RNZAF's No. 488 Squadron, against the Japanese in Singapore. Fisken claimed the destruction of another fighter on 1 February but he was injured in the arm and leg by a cannon shell before the dogfight ended. Unable to lower his undercarriage when he returned to Kallang, he crash landed on the airfield. He was evacuated to New Zealand shortly before Singapore fell. Fisken was subsequently commissioned as a pilot officer.

=== Solomon Islands campaign ===
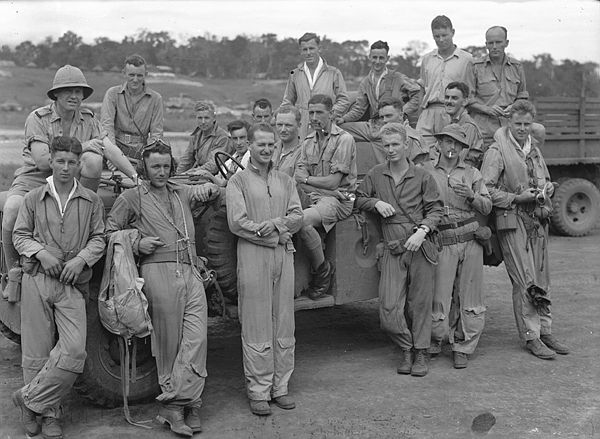
Pilots of No. 14 Squadron with a Dodge weapons carrier at Guadalcanal, grouped together after a patrol; Fisken stands at back with white scarf

In April the RNZAF formed No. 14 Squadron at Ohakea, using as its core flying and ground personnel who had served in Malaya with No. 488 Squadron. Employed in the home defence role, the squadron were initially equipped with North American Harvard trainer aircraft, while awaiting delivery of Curtiss P-40 Kittyhawk fighters. These duly arrived at the end of the month. By this time Fisken, recovered from his wounds, had joined the squadron. He named his Kittyhawk Wairarapa Wildcat. By 1943 the RNZAF's focus in the war effort was supporting the advance of the United States forces in the Solomon Islands; its fighter squadrons began to move forward from New Zealand in April 1943.

No. 14 Squadron was posted to Espiritu Santo, in the New Hebrides, where they were tasked with the island's defence and carried interceptions of unidentified aircraft. On 11 June, it moved forward to the front line at Kukum Field on Guadalcanal, replacing No. 15 Squadron, which had been based there for the previous six weeks. The following day a large formation of Japanese fighters and bombers was detected and the squadron scrambled to attack the incoming aircraft. During the resulting engagement, Fisken destroyed a pair of Mitsubishi A6M Zero fighters. On 4 July, Fisken was leading a patrol over Munda, New Georgia, when they were attacked by several Zeroes. He managed to evade his attackers and destroyed two of them. Then, while trying to rejoin his flight of aircraft, he spotted a Mitsubishi G4M medium bomber and shot this down.

In late September Fisken was awarded the Distinguished Flying Cross (DFC) in "recognition of gallantry displayed in flying operations against the enemy in the Solomon Islands." However, by this time he was back in New Zealand; increasingly troubled with poor health, he had been repatriated the previous month. Fisken, who now held the rank of flying officer, was formally released on medical grounds from the RNZAF in December. The investiture for his DFC was held at Wellington the following year.

== Later life ==
Following his discharge from the RNZAF, Fisken returned to farming in Masterton. He was later employed by the Egg Marketing Board after selling his farm before eventually retiring in 1976 after another period of farming, this time at Te Puke. He died on 12 June 2011 at Lara Lodge in Rotorua where he had lived for 31 years. His wife, Rhoda, predeceased him by 14 years. Together they had six children, five boys and a girl.

Although his last victories in the Solomons were clearly documented, the number of his confirmed victories over Singapore has been contested, giving rise to totals of between ten and thirteen in different sources. Nevertheless, he is believed to have destroyed eleven aircraft, with another deemed to have been probably destroyed. He is also credited with damaging an aircraft. Fisken is considered to be the highest scoring British Commonwealth ace in the Pacific theatre.
