= Ruth Herrick =

Ruth Herrick CBE
- Born: Hermione Ruth Herrick; 19 January 1889; Ruataniwha, Central Hawke's Bay, New Zealand
- Died: 21 January 1983 (aged 94); Wellington, New Zealand
- Occupation(s): Girl Guide leader and women's naval administrator
- Relatives: Michael Herrick (nephew)

Hermione Ruth Herrick CBE (19 January 1889 – 21 January 1983) was the Chief Commissioner for the New Zealand Girl Guides and the first director of the Women's Royal New Zealand Naval Service.

== Biography ==
Herrick was born in Ruataniwha, Central Hawke's Bay, New Zealand, on 19 January 1889. She attended Queen's College in London along with Katherine Mansfield.

During World War I she was secretary to the Nursing Division at Walton-on-Thames Hospital, England.

Following the war she briefly returned to New Zealand where she became Provincial Commissioner for the girl guides in Hawkes Bay. This led to a growing interest and in 1931 she returned to England to pursue it further. She became close with Robert and Olave Baden-Powell and attended the seventh conference of the World Association of Girl Guides and Girl Scouts in Poland along with several smaller conferences in England. With this experience she was appointed deputy Commissioner for the New Zealand Girl Guides in 1932, quickly becoming Chief Commissioner in 1934. This was a position she would hold for 27 years.

She was the first director of the Women's Royal New Zealand Naval Service, established in 1942. As the director she was responsible for recruitment and developed a high standard of recruitment.

In the 1946 New Year Honours, Herrick was appointed an Officer of the Order of the British Empire. She was awarded the Silver Fish in 1949, and in 1953 she was awarded the Queen Elizabeth II Coronation Medal. In the 1962 Queen's Birthday Honours, Herrick was promoted to Commander of the Order of the British Empire, for outstanding service to the girl guide movement in New Zealand for over 30 years.
