= Women's Royal New Zealand Naval Service =

- Active: 1942–1946; 1947–1977
- Country: New Zealand
- Type: Navy
- Role: Naval warfare
- Size: Personnel: 519 (peak strength)
- Engagements: Second World War: Home Front

Commanders
- Notable commanders: Ruth Herrick (1942–1946); Lorelle Corbin (1947–1963)

The Women's Royal New Zealand Naval Service (WRNZNS) was the female auxiliary of the Royal New Zealand Navy (RNZN). Raised during the Second World War, most of its personnel, known as Wrens, served as signallers and operators of naval equipment on the Home Front. At its peak, it had a strength of over 500 serving personnel. The WRNZNS disbanded in 1946 but was resurrected the following year to compensate for reduced manpower in the RNZN. It was disbanded again in 1977 when women were allowed to serve with the Royal New Zealand Navy.

== Formation ==
Following the outbreak of the Second World War, it was some time before the potential contribution of women to the war effort was appreciated in New Zealand. It was not until late 1940 that a Women's War Service Auxiliary (WWSA) was formed with the task of co-ordinating the use of women in the war effort. This then led to the formation of female auxiliary services for the branches of the New Zealand Military Forces. By May 1941, there was official discussion for a naval service for women. At that time, female civilian employees of the Royal New Zealand Navy (RNZN) had already replaced men in some roles, mainly in supply and clerical work.

Following further discussion, one topic of debate being whether women would be required to work at nights before it was realised that this would overly limit their potential contribution to the war effort, the New Zealand War cabinet approved the establishment of the Women's Royal New Zealand Naval Service (WRNZNS) in April 1942. The first director of the service was Ruth Herrick, with the rank of chief officer, appointed on 18 May. King George VI conferred the service with royal status a few months later.

Applicants to join the WRNZNS were initially screened by the WWSA, of which Herrick was a key member. However, the WWSA ceased to be involved after a few months as there was increasing dissatisfaction with how recruitment was being handled. Ruth Herrick proved to be a strict recruiter and of the initial applicants over a third were rejected. Applications were then transferred to the National Service Department, responsible for recruitment into the New Zealand Military Forces. This saw an increased number of applications as the year progressed.

WRNZNS personnel, known as Wrens, were required to serve for the duration of the war and then a 12-month period afterwards, unless discharged prior. From November 1942, under the terms of the Women's Royal New Zealand Naval Service Emergency Regulations, the WRNZNS was incorporated into the RNZN. Wrens were subject to many of the laws and regulations that applied to personnel of the RNZN, but also enjoyed some of the benefits as well. Initially, most only worked at naval establishments near their homes but later, it was expected that they could be employed anywhere in New Zealand.

The organisation was arranged along the lines of the equivalent organisation in the United Kingdom. Recruits underwent a brief period of training at HMNZS Philomel, the RNZN training establishment at Devonport in Auckland.

== War service ==
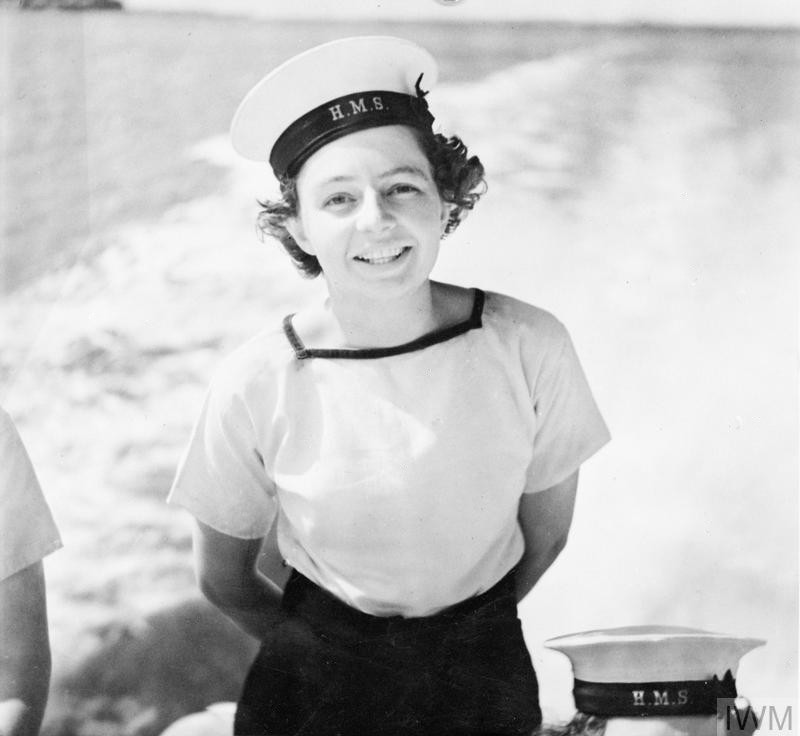
A Wren of the WRNZNS on the deck of the Commodore's launch

The first Wren commenced service in July 1942, and by the end of the year, the organisation had 155 Wrens on strength. Some of the early recruits to the WRNZNS were the civilians previously employed by the RNZN; their dates of commencement of service was antedated so that they were prioritised for promotion.

Many Wrens were taught signalling and this formed a major function for the WRNZNS. Some were employed at the naval wireless telegraph station at Waiouru Military Camp in the central North Island. Others were drivers, cooks, clerks, or worked in the medical services. In Auckland, the Commodore's launch was staffed by Wrens and they also performed servicing work on torpedoes. Some were trained in radar duties and worked in this capacity at Takapuna while others worked at an experimental radar station at Mount Victoria, in Wellington, that was operated by the Department of Scientific and Industrial Research. Teams of Wrens operated degaussing ranges at Auckland and Wellington. Although a secret at the time, from late 1942 eight Wrens served in an intelligence station in Blenheim, monitoring Japanese navy radio traffic.

In 1945, the Admiralty requested 200 Wrens for service in its naval bases in the Far East. This had to be declined as the WRNZNS had insufficient numbers to fulfill the request. Although it had an authorised establishment of 700 personnel, it never reached this total. At its largest, in October 1944, the service only numbered 519 personnel. In total, 633 women served in the WRNZNS during the war. None of its personnel served overseas, in contrast to the corresponding women's army and air force services.

In the immediate postwar period, most Wrens were used to assist in the demobilisation of the RNZN, under the auspices of the Navy Office. By March 1946, WRNZNS had less than 300 personnel, and the organisation was disestablished at the end of the year. Herrick was made an officer of the Order of the British Empire for her services while Director of the WRNZNS.

== Re-establishment ==
In 1947, the RNZN was depleted in manpower after a strike over postwar service conditions. To help remedy this, the WRNZNS was re-established so that Wrens could assume some of the onshore duties performed by RNZN personnel, freeing the men up for service at sea. Lorelle Corbin was the director of the WRNZNS; she served with the organisation during its war years and had been part of the New Zealand contingent in the victory parade held in London the previous year. In 1950, legislation was passed by the New Zealand Government that officially made the WRNZNS part of the RNZN.

In its reconstituted form, the WRNZNS struggled to attract personnel and Corbin maintained the high standards for recruits set by her predecessor. Its personnel were mainly employed in two locations, at Philomel and the Navy Office in Wellington. Wrens had less opportunities in peacetime, and much of the work they had performed during the war years was now carried out by men of the RNZN. By the 1960s, there were fewer than 50 Wrens serving in the WRNZNS. To retain Wrens, they were allowed to remain in the service if they married.

As with the corresponding army and air force women's services, the WRNZNS was disbanded in 1977. This followed the introduction of the Human Rights Commission Act 1977, leading to a decision to do away with separate services for women in the New Zealand military. Women were now able to serve alongside men in the RNZN. The final parade of the WRNZNS was in July that year. During its existence between 1942 and 1977, 1921 women served in the WRNZNS.

== See also ==
- Women's Auxiliary Air Force
- Women's Auxiliary Army Corps
