= No. 15 Squadron RNZAF =

New Zealand fighter squadron during World War II

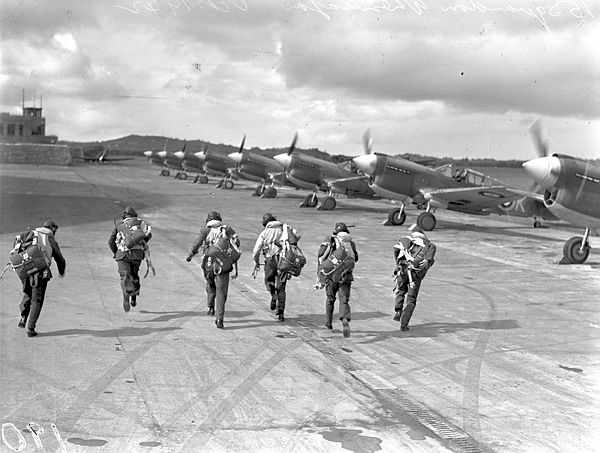
- Pilots of No. 15 Squadron running to their Kittyhawks at Whenuapai, October 1942
- Active: June 1942 – October 1945
- Country: New Zealand
- Branch: Royal New Zealand Air Force
- Role: Fighter
- Equipment: P-40 Kittyhawk; F4U Corsair
- Engagements: World War II

No. 15 Squadron was a fighter squadron of the Royal New Zealand Air Force that was formed in June 1942. It served in Tonga, Guadalcanal, New Georgia, Espiritu Santo, Bougainville and Green Island. The squadron was equipped with Kittyhawk and, later, F4U Corsair fighters. The squadron was disbanded in October 1945.

== History ==
After being formed in June 1942, under the command of Squadron Leader A. Crighton, No. 15 Squadron was sent to Tonga later that year where it began operating the P-40 Kittyhawk. It deployed to Kukum Field on Guadalcanal in April 1943, under the command of Squadron Leader Michael Herrick. In October 1943, the squadron formed part of a New Zealand fighter wing along with No. 18 Squadron RNZAF; in November 1943 the wing flew over 1,000 sorties in support of operations on Bougainville Island, beginning with the Landings at Cape Torokina. After periods operating from New Georgia, Espiritu Santo and Bougainville Island, the squadron was deployed to Green Island from February to April 1945. By this stage it was operating F4U Corsair aircraft. It was disbanded in October 1945.

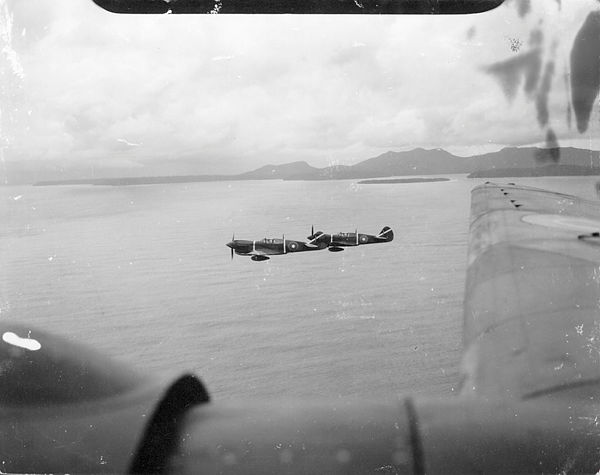
Two Kittyhawks of No. 15 Squadron, viewed from a No. 3 Squadron Hudson, while on patrol over the central Solomon Islands. The Kittyhawk pilots are believed to be Squadron Leader M. J. Herrick and Flight Lieutenant S. R. Duncan

No. 15 Squadron flew more sorties than any other New Zealand fighter squadron in the Pacific theatre of World War II.

== Commanding officers ==
The following served as commanding officers of No. 15 Squadron:

- Squadron Leader A. Crighton (June 1942–March 1943);
- Squadron Leader M. J. Herrick (March–December 1943);
- Squadron Leader J. A. A. Gibson (December 1943–July 1944);
- Squadron Leader D. P. Winstone (August–December 1944);
- Squadron Leader M. R. Clarke (January–September 1945).
