= Structure of the Royal New Zealand Air Force =

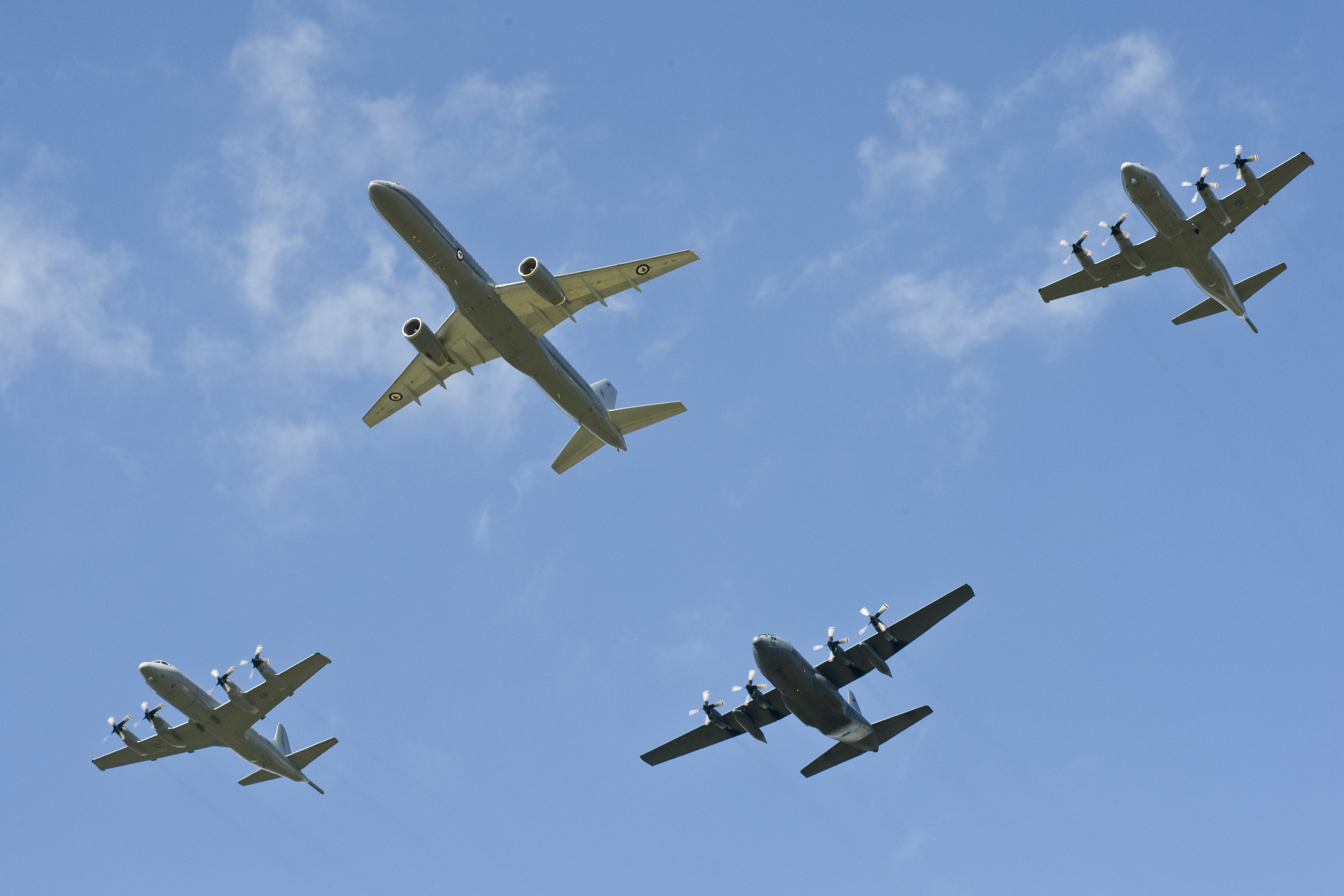
Two RNZAF P3K Orions flying in formation with a Boeing 757 and a C-130 Hercules in March 2009

The Royal New Zealand Air Force (RNZAF) is organised into a small number of flying squadrons and ground-based units. Most of the RNZAF's operational and training units are stationed at RNZAF Base Auckland and RNZAF Base Ohakea in the North Island. Several training and maintenance units are located at RNZAF Base Woodbourne in the South Island.

== Second World War ==
During the Second World War, three groups were formed: Northern Group RNZAF, in the North of the North Island (HQ Auckland), Central Group RNZAF (HQ Wellington), in the South of the North Island, and Southern Group RNZAF (HQ Christchurch), in the South Island. They were in the process of formation by February 1942. In August 1942 these Group HQs were raised to the status of Air HQs and placed under an Air Commodore.

In September 1943 the RNZAF reached its peak strength in New Zealand. By this time establishments included Air Headquarters in Wellington, the three group headquarters, and a total of thirty-three stations and depots throughout the country. The Group Headquarters were combined headquarters and housed Navy and Army as well as Air Force staffs. Northern and Central Groups were operational in function, and were equipped with filter rooms and fighter operations rooms, while Southern Group was primarily responsible for training. Northern Group, besides administering stations in New Zealand, also controlled Norfolk Island, where a radar unit and a servicing section catered for transient aircraft.

At that time Northern Group administered RNZAF Station Waipapakauri, RNZAF Station Onerahi, RNZAF Station Whenuapai, and the stations at Mangere, Seagrove, Hamilton, Te Awamutu, Rotorua, Tauranga, and Swanson. No. 1 Stores Depot RNZAF moved on 10 April 1943 from the Exhibition Hall in central Hamilton to the northern outskirts of Hamilton, where RNZAF Station Te Rapa was established. Air Commodore Maurice Buckley commanded Northern Group from Auckland in 1942–43. Between April 1944-31 March 1945, the station at Tauranga was vacated.

Later, No. 1 (Islands) Group RNZAF served in the Solomon Islands.

Air Commodore James Findlay served as Air Officer Commanding Central Group from 1942. Central Group was suspended in October 1943, and its functions shared between Air Headquarters and the other two groups. Northern and Southern Groups were disbanded in October 1944.

=== Northern Group, July 1943 ===
Fighter Ops Room/Filter Room/COIC, Auckland

Unit	Base	Equipment
No. 1 Personnel Dispatch Centre	Auckland	
Transit Servicing Unit	Waipapakauri	
Station HQ Servicing Unit	Onerahi	
No. 1 Squadron RNZAF	Whenuapai	12 Hudon, 2 Oxford
No. 17 Squadron RNZAF	Whenuapai	
No. 40 Squadron RNZAF	Whenuapai	
No. 60 Squadron RNZAF	Whenuapai	RDF
No. 1 RNZAF Hospital	Whenuapai	
No. 4 Field Maintenance Unit	Whenuapai	
Seaplane Training Flight	RNZAF Station Hobsonville	
No. 1 Assembly Depot	Hobsonville	
General Engineering Section	Hobsonville	
Marine Section	Hobsonville	
No. 1 AA Cooperation Flight	Mangere	
Northern Group Communications Flight	Mangere	
Works Construction Depot	Mangere	
No. 15 Squadron RNZAF	Mangere	Kittyhawk (Anti Malarial Treatment)
Bulk Fuel Storage Depot	Otahuhu	
No. 1 Stores Depot RNZAF	Hamilton	
No. 1 Repair Depot	Hamilton	
No. 302 Elementary Ground Training Squadron	Hamilton	
No. 4 Stores Depot RNZAF	Te Awamutu	
Initial Training Wing	Rotorua	
Central Flying School RNZAF	Tauranga	Moth, Harvard, Oxford
No. 303 Elementary Ground Training Squadron	Tauranga	
No. 51 RDF Unit Servicing Section	Norfolk Island	

Through much of the postwar period the RNZAF was administered through two groups. At RNZAF Station Wigram in the outskirts of Christchurch was Training Group RNZAF (active by May 1948–early 1970s at least) responsible for training and support. By 1988 Training Group had become Support Group RNZAF, which included No. 1 Stores Depot RNZAF at RNZAF Te Rapa and No. 1 Repair Depot RNZAF at RNZAF Base Woodbourne (New Zealand Official Yearbooks). Operations Group RNZAF at Auckland at one time supervised Strike, Transport and Maritime Operations Wings. Operations Group was formed on 1 July 1965, initially under the command of Air Commodore K.W. Trigance.

A skeleton listing of RNZAF units, grouped under Operations Group and Support Group and seemingly circa 1984, can be seen at Desmond Ball's "The Anzac Connection."

Operations Group and Support Group were merged into Air Command, under an official who was to be called the "RNZAF Air Commander" but in common reference was usually known as AOC Air Command, on 30 April 1995.

== Current structure ==
The RNZAF includes the following units. Note that the organisational structure below is likely to contain some omissions and inaccuracies. In particular, Ground Training and Nos. 485 and 488 Wings were disestablished in early 2015 and replaced by Base Commanders. As part of the same reorganisation, the headquarters of No. 209 (Expeditionary Support) Squadron was disestablished, and its RNZAF Force Protection, air movements, aviation refuelling, and other sub-units reassigned. Woodbourne was the first base to make the change, synchronised with a routine change of command; Ohakea and Auckland followed.

- Chief of Air Force (Wellington)
  - Air Staff
  - Air Component Commander
    - Base Commander Auckland
      - No. 6 Squadron (8 x SH-2G Super Seasprite)
      - No. 40 Squadron (5 x C-130J Super Hercules, 2 x Boeing 757-200)
      - No. 62 Squadron – Space Operations (Monitoring, analysing and understanding space activity)
      - No 230 Squadron (Mission Support -intelligence and computer and information systems)
      - Base Operations Squadron Auckland
      - Aviation Medicine Unit
      - Parachute Training Support Unit
  - Base Commander Ohakea
    - No. 3 Squadron (A-109 T/LUH, NH90 MUH)
    - No. 5 Squadron (4 x P-8 Poseidon)
    - No. 14 Squadron (11 x T-6 Texan II)
    - No. 42 Squadron (4 x Super King Air 350)
    - Base Operations Squadron Ohakea
    - Central Flying School
      - Air Force Heritage Flight of New Zealand
    - RNZAF Base Woodbourne
    - Ground Training Wing
      - Command and Recruit Training Squadron
      - Technical Training Squadron
      - Mission Support Training Squadron
      - Base Operations Squadron Woodbourne
      - Airbus Aircraft Facility (Heavy maintenance facility for the repair of aircraft airframes, engines and avionics systems)
      - Nelson Marlborough Institute of Technology Aeronautical Engineering programme
