= No. 488 Wing RNZAF =

No. 488 Wing
- Active: 2010–2015
- Country: New Zealand
- Branch: Royal New Zealand Air Force
- Garrison/HQ: RNZAF Base Ohakea

No. 488 Wing was the wing of the Royal New Zealand Air Force (RNZAF) with responsibility for commanding all units based at RNZAF Base Ohakea. It was established in December 2010 and disbanded in March 2015.

== History and role ==
In mid-2010 the RNZAF conducted a review of its command and control arrangements. This review followed the death of a member of the Red Checkers aerobatics team in a flying accident on 14 January 2010 and the crash of a No. 3 Squadron RNZAF Bell UH-1 Iroquois on 25 April 2010 which resulted in the death of three airmen. The courts of inquiry into both accidents concluded that insufficient supervision of the units stationed at RNZAF Base Ohakea had contributed to unsafe flying practices. In particular, the court of inquiry into the Iroquois accident found that the abolition of the RNZAF's geographically co-located base command positions in 2001 had resulted in a harmful lack of clarity around command responsibility.

As a result of the recommendations of the command and control review, the RNZAF decided to establish a wing headquarters to command the units stationed at Ohakea. The new unit would complement No. 485 Wing, which commands the units stationed at RNZAF Base Auckland. Accordingly, No. 488 Wing Headquarters was raised on 8 December 2010. The wing's name was selected to honour No. 488 Squadron RNZAF, a fighter unit which saw combat in the Pacific and Europe during World War II. As part of the new command arrangements, the RNZAF's Training Group was disbanded, with its Flying Training Wing being reassigned to No. 488 Wing. No. 3 Squadron was also transferred from No. 485 Wing to No. 488 Wing.

In early 2011 No. 488 Wing headquarters issued directives aimed at addressing "urgent deficiencies" in the Defence Force Flying Orders. The flying orders were eventually completely re-written during 2012. In addition to its work in improving flying standards, the wing has also overseen the process of introducing RNZAF's AgustaWestland AW109 and NHIndustries NH90 helicopters into service.

No. 488 Wing was disbanded on 2 March 2015 as part of a major reform to the RNZAF's structure. No. 485 Wing and No. 209 Squadron were also disbanded as part of the reorganisation.

== Structure ==
As of December 2014, No. 488 Wing comprised the following units:

- No. 3 Squadron (Bell UH-1 Iroquois, A109, NH90)
- Flying Training Headquarters
  - Central Flying School
  - Pilot Training Squadron (Aerospace Industries CT-4E Airtrainer)
  - No. 42 Squadron (Beechcraft Super King Air B200)
