= Black Falcons =

Royal New Zealand Air Force aerobatic display team

RNZAF Black Falcons
- Black Falcons patch
- Active: January – December 2000; November 2023– present
- Country: New Zealand
- Branch: Royal New Zealand Air Force
- Type: Aerobatic Display Team
- Size: 5 x Beechcraft T-6 Texan II
- Garrison/HQ: RNZAF Base Ohakea
- Colors: Black and white
- Mascot: New Zealand Falcon
- Equipment: Beechcraft T-6 Texan II

The Black Falcons is the aerobatic display team of the Royal New Zealand Air Force.

== History ==
=== First iteration (2000–2001) ===
The team was first formed in 2000 using five Aermacchi MB-339CB aircraft from No. 14 Squadron, flown by 14 Squadron instructors. The first of five displays was held on 1 January 2000 at the Gisborne Millennium and the team disbanded later that year.

=== Second iteration (2016–present) ===
In January 2016, Central Flying School (CFS) began flying 11 Beechcraft T-6 Texan II, sharing the aircraft with No. 14 Squadron. The previous RNZAF Red Checkers display team was disbanded, and the newly formed group was named the RNZAF Black Falcons. The team is made up of Qualified Flying Instructors of the Central Flying School and No.14 Squadron. The bulk of the team generally come from CFS, with the Team Leader (Falcon 1), normally also holding the post of Officer Commanding Central Flying School.

The new team's first display was scheduled for the 2017 Wings over Wairarapa airshow, although bad weather caused the displays to be cancelled. Instead the first display was held at the RNZAF 80th Anniversary Air Tattoo at the team's home base, RNZAF Base Ohakea the following week.

Ahead of the 2026 display season, Lieutenant Commander Stephen Knowles became the first Royal New Zealand Navy pilot to join the team.
