= Red Checkers =

- Red Checkers team patch
- Active: 1967–1973, 1980–2015.
- Disbanded: January 2015
- Country: New Zealand
- Branch: Royal New Zealand Air Force
- Type: Aerobatic display team
- Role: Display team
- Size: Seven pilots
- Garrison/HQ: Central Flying School RNZAF, RNZAF Base Ohakea
- Nickname: The Checkers
- Colors: Red and White

Insignia
- Identification symbol: Red and White checkers

Aircraft flown
- Trainer: CT-4E Airtrainer (1998–2015); CT-4B Airtrainer (1980–1998), T-6 Texan (1967–1973)

The Red Checkers was the aerobatic/precision flying Team of the Royal New Zealand Air Force. The Checkers fly the Pacific Aerospace CT-4E Airtrainer. Previous aircraft used were the CT4B and North American Harvard (T-6). Until the year 1994 the Checkers were based at Wigram. Aircraft used by the team had a nose painted in a red and white checkered pattern, but this has now been reduced to a small checkered stripe.

In 1973 the team was disbanded due to a world fuel crisis but was formed again in 1980.

== Incidents ==
Squadron Leader Nick Cree was killed when the CT-4 training aircraft he was flying hit the ground while practicing aerial display manoeuvres near RNZAF Base Ohakea on 14 January 2010.

On 1 March 2010 two aircraft touched during training with one aircraft incurring minor damage. The Red Checkers were grounded for the rest of the season.

== Disbandment ==
The Red Checkers display team was disbanded following the retirement of the CT-4 Airtrainer. They were replaced by the Black Falcons, who fly the Beechcraft T-6 Texan II.
