= Pilot Training Squadron RNZAF =

The Pilot Training Squadron based at RNZAF Base Ohakea, and trained RNZAF pilots from 1966 until 2015.

== Origins ==
Military pilot training during World War I was undertaken by private contractors; principally the New Zealand Flying School of the Walsh Brothers in Auckland and the Canterbury Aviation Company formed by Henry Wigram in Christchurch.

When the New Zealand Permanent Air Force was formed in June 1923, war surplus Avro 504K and Bristol F2B Fighters transferred from Britain were used for training purposes, supplemented from 1929 by de Havilland Gypsy Moths and replaced from 1931 by Hawker Tomtits and Avro 626s. A single two seat Gloster Grebe provided conversion training on that type. in anticipation of the delivery of Vickers Wellington bombers, twin engine monoplane training began on the first of 229 Airspeed Oxfords in 1938.

== World War II ==
By the outbreak of World War II the more modern of these types had been formed into No. 1 Flying Training School RNZAF at Wigram, while advanced training on types such as the Oxford had been separated. Due to the Commonwealth Air Training Plan, other schools were under construction at Taieri, and Woodbourne. A large number of additional FTSs followed with the first few years of the war, while from 1939 335 de Havilland Tiger Moths manufactured in Wellington provided the main primary trainers. Until 1941 much advanced training was done on retired combat types such as the Hawker Hind, Vickers Vildebeest and Fairey Gordon but these were gradually replaced by 202 locally assembled North American Harvards.

== Post war ==
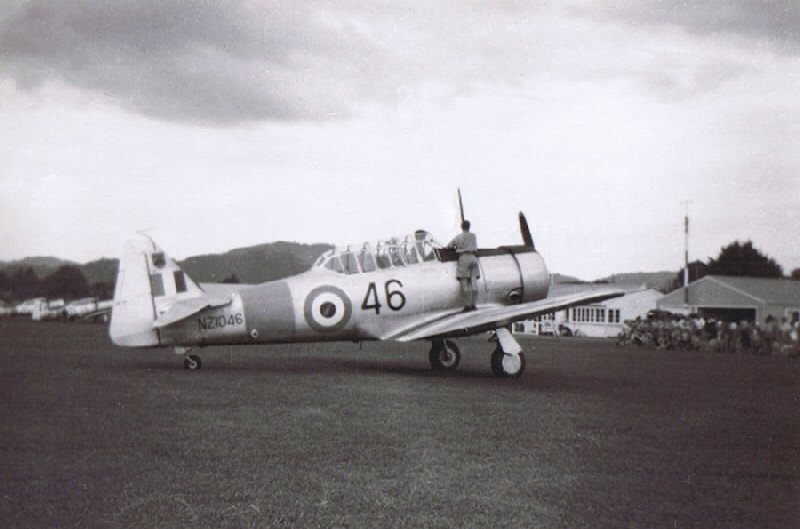
Harvards continued to be used until the mid-1970s

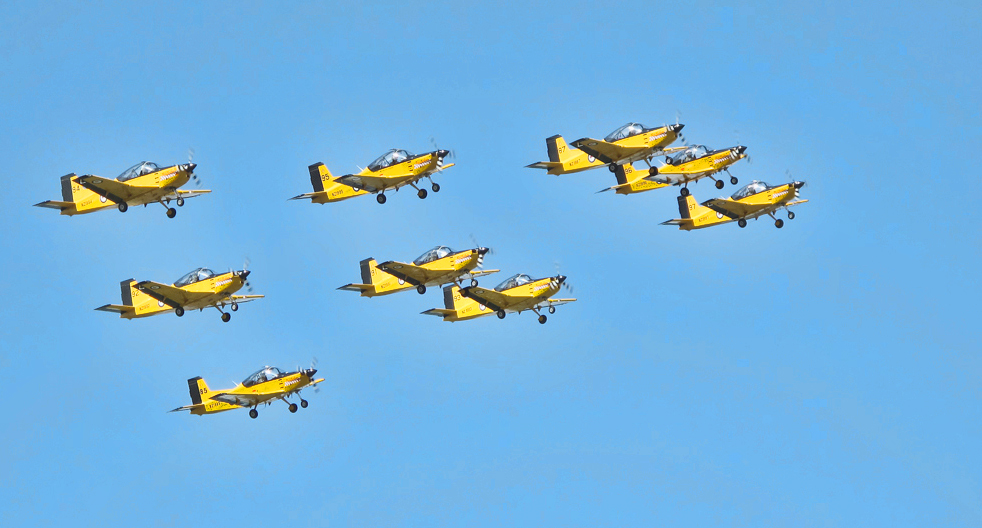
CT/4E Airtrainers at the Whenuapai air show in March 2009

After the second world war, primary flying training was conducted by No.1 Flying Training School at Taieri, and from 1956 Wigram. The Tiger Moths were phased out, Harvards being used for ab intio training, de Havilland Devon and two seat De Havilland Vampires being used for advanced training. 1 FTS became the Pilot Training Squadron in 1966. The squadron received a small number of AESL Airtourer in 1970 and re-equipped with Pacific Aerospace CT-4B Airtrainers in 1976, these subsequently being replaced by more powerful CT-4Es.

Advanced training on BAC Strikemaster and Aermacchi MB-339 shifted to No. 14 Squadron RNZAF, twin engined training on Fokker Friendships and later Cessna Golden Eagles and Beechcraft Super King Airs being undertaken by No. 42 Squadron RNZAF. No. 3 Squadron undertook basic rotary training with the Bell 47. When Wigram closed in 1993 the squadron shifted to Ohakea.

Pilot Training Squadron was disbanded in 2015 with the retirement of the Airtrainer. Its role was taken over by a reformed No. 14 Squadron which operated the replacement T-6 Texan II.
