= Air Force Heritage Flight of New Zealand =

New Zealand aerial organisation

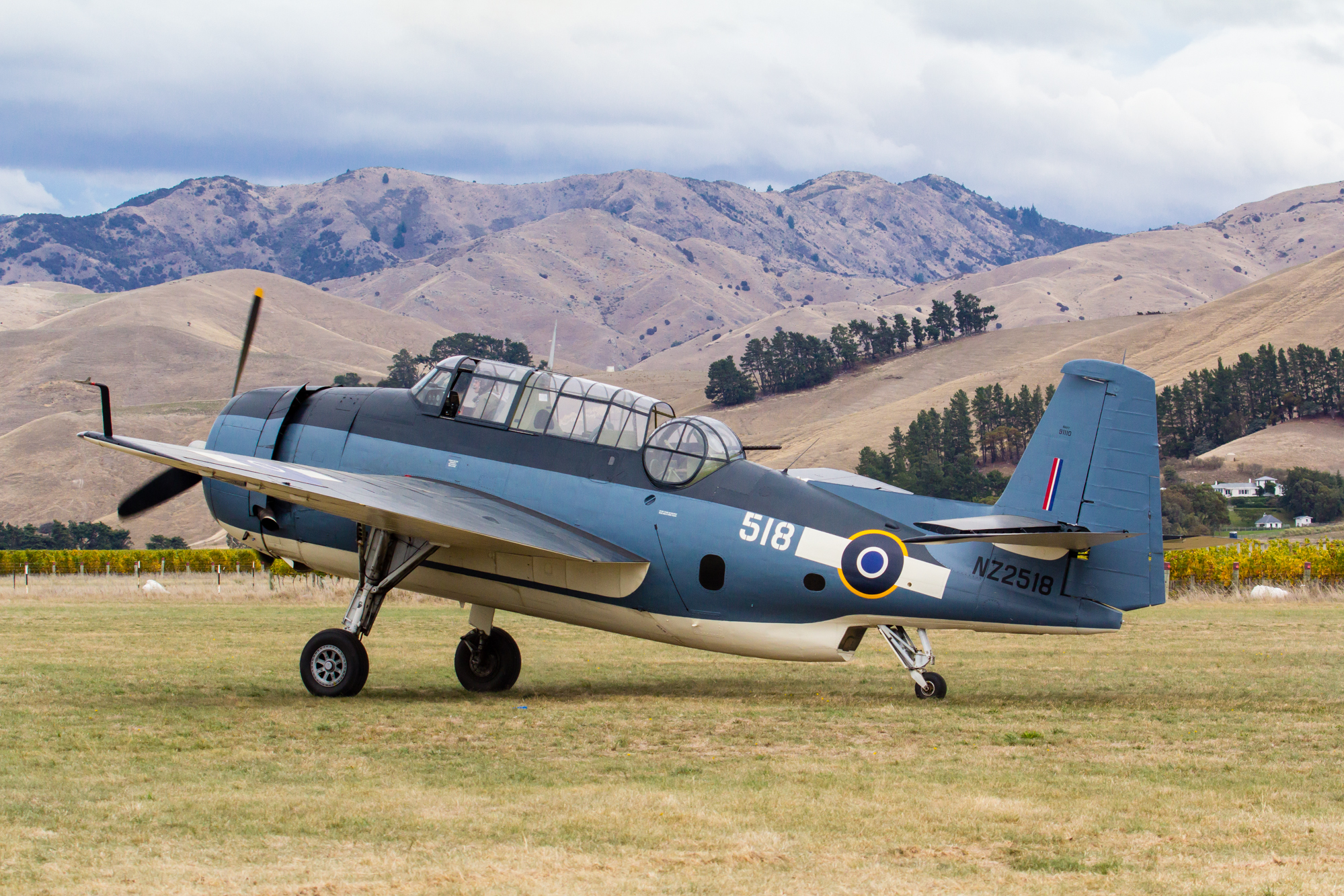
- The Grumman TBM Avenger that is now operated by the Air Force Heritage Flight of New Zealand, photographed in 2015
- Active: 2022 – current
- Country: New Zealand
- Branch: Royal New Zealand Air Force
- Role: Historic aircraft display
- Part of: Central Flying School RNZAF
- Current base: RNZAF Base Ohakea

The Air Force Heritage Flight of New Zealand is a combined civilian and military organisation that operates preserved aircraft of types that served with the Royal New Zealand Air Force (RNZAF). It was established in 2022 and replaced the RNZAF Historic Flight. The RNZAF provides pilots who operate privately owned aircraft.

== History and role ==
The RNZAF Historic Flight was established in 1977 to operate a retired North American T-6 Harvard and a de Havilland Tiger Moth. These aircraft were joined by an Avro 626 for part of 1987.

A review was conducted into the New Zealand Defence Force's involvement with historic aircraft after an incident in which the RNZAF Historic Flight's Harvard made an emergency landing in 2018. While the review considered whether the NZDF should end this involvement, it concluded that a new heritage flight should be established. The review also recommended that the new unit focus on operating former combat aircraft rather than the training aircraft which the RNZAF Historic Flight had been equipped with. The review's recommendations were accepted, and the RNZAF Historic Flight was disbanded.

In March 2022 the Air Force Heritage Flight of New Zealand was established to replace the RNZAF Historic Flight. It is based at the Central Flying School at RNZAF Base Ohakea. The flight's mission statement is: "to preserve in flying condition aircraft that represent the RNZAF’s heritage, to commemorate the past and promote the RNZAF by engaging, educating and inspiring the next generation".

As the RNZAF is not able to acquire new historic aircraft, the Air Force Heritage Flight of New Zealand operates in partnership with civilian organisations. In particular, the unit partnered upon establishment with the Biggin Hill Trust which operated a Supermarine Spitfire and Grumman TBM Avenger from Ohakea. This built on a relationship between the RNZAF and the Biggin Hill Trust that began in 2014.

The RNZAF provides pilots for the Biggin Hill Trust's aircraft as well as a privately owned Harvard. Most flying was initially undertaken using the Harvard, as the Avenger and Spitfire airframes have fewer flight hours remaining. A Tiger Moth owned by the Air Force Museum of New Zealand which has been on loan to the RNZAF since 1987 is also used to provide initial training. All of the Air Force Heritage Flight of New Zealand's initial pilots were qualified flying instructors who were posted to other RNZAF units. The Biggin Hill Trust completed the restoration of a former RNZAF North American P-51D Mustang in 2023 and it began to be used by the Air Force Heritage Flight in early 2024.

== Aircraft ==
Aircraft	Origin	Type	Variant	In service	Notes
North American T-6 Harvard	United States	Trainer	T-6 Mk III	1 (NZ1076)	
de Havilland Tiger Moth	British Empire	Trainer	DH.82a	1 (NZ662)	
Supermarine Spitfire	British Empire	Fighter	LF Mk. IX E	1 (PV270)	
Grumman TBM Avenger	United States	Torpedo bomber	TBM-3E	1 (NZ2518)	
North American P-51 Mustang	United States	Fighter	NA P-51D	1 (NZ2423)	

== See also ==
- Battle of Britain Memorial Flight
- No. 100 Squadron RAAF
