= Central Flying School RNZAF =

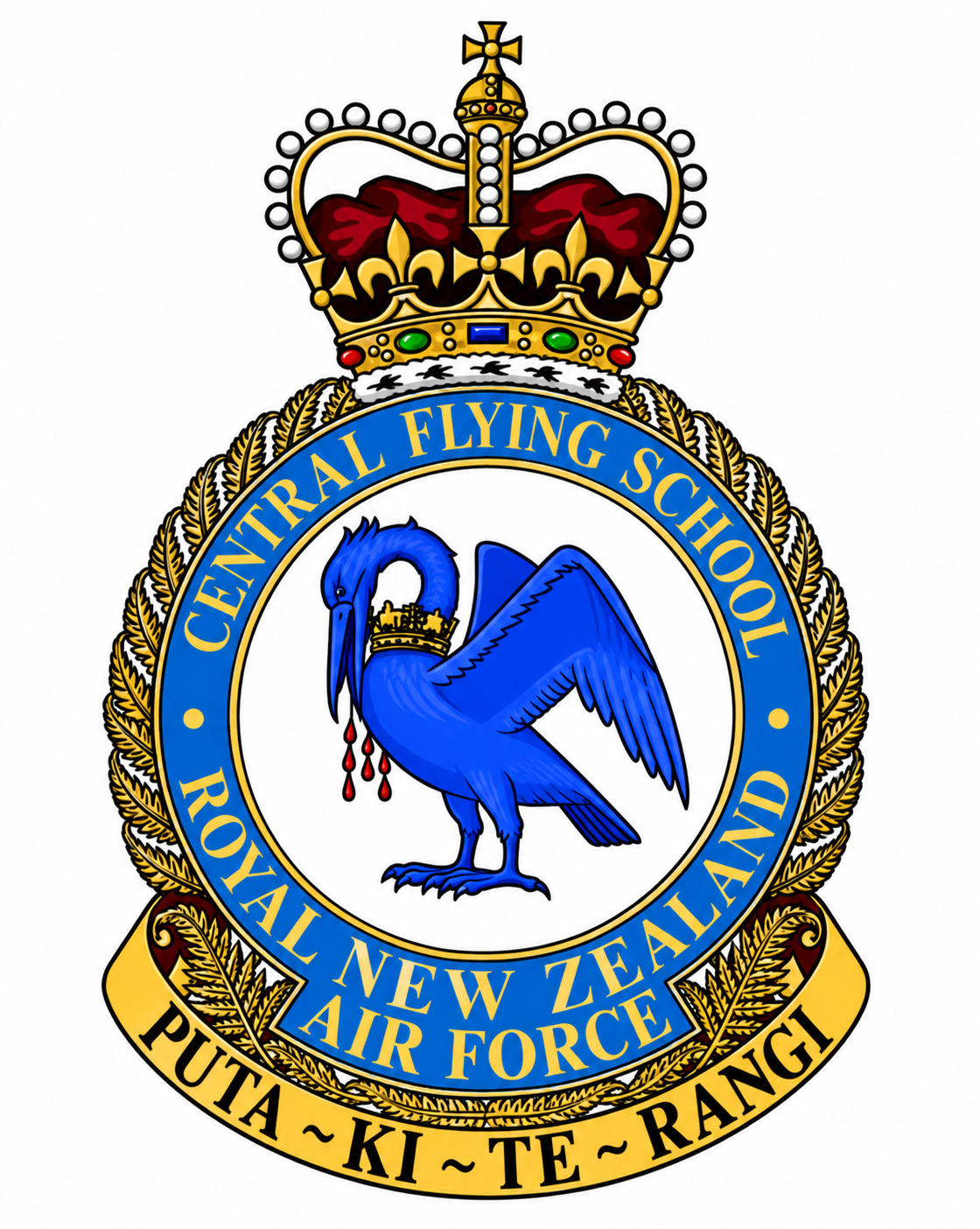
- Active: 1939–present
- Country: New Zealand
- Branch: Royal New Zealand Air Force
- Role: Flight instructor training
- Base: RNZAF Base Ohakea
- Colors: Black and White
- Equipment: Beechcraft T-6 Texan II

Commanders
- Current commander: Squadron Leader Matthew Stapp

Aircraft flown
- Trainer: Beechcraft T-6 Texan II

Central Flying School is the Royal New Zealand Air Force (RNZAF) unit which is responsible for training the force's flight instructors. It was established at the start of World War II as the Flying Instructors School and assumed its current name 1941. The unit was stationed at RNZAF Base Wigram from 1945 until 1993 when it moved to RNZAF Base Ohakea.

== History ==
Following the outbreak of World War II, the RNZAF established a Flying Instructors School (FIS) at Māngere near Auckland. The unit was subsequently transferred to Hobsonville and relocated again to Tauranga in 1941. At the time of the move to Tauranga the FIS was renamed the Central Flying School (CFS).

After the conclusion of World War II, the CFS was transferred to RNZAF Base Woodbourne near the South Island town of Blenheim. At about this time the unit established an aerobatic team, which was renamed the Red Checkers in 1967. This team was disbanded in 1973 as a result of the 1973 oil crisis, but was reformed in 1980; the team is currently staffed by volunteers from the CFS and the RNZAF's Pilot Training Squadron. The CFS moved to RNZAF Base Ohakea on the North Island in 1993, where it remains. In addition to its flight training role, the CFS also operates the RNZAF Historic Aircraft Flight's de Havilland Tiger Moth and North American Harvard aircraft.

The CFS shared Aerospace Industries CT-4E Airtrainer aircraft with the Pilot Training Squadron, and ran five month long flying instructor courses. Graduates of this course were posted to the Pilot Training Squadron, and may then be transferred to the RNZAF's operational squadrons after completing a six-month probationary period. In addition, the CFS was also responsible for auditing flying standards within the Air Force. At this time the CFS was the smallest flying unit of the RNZAF.

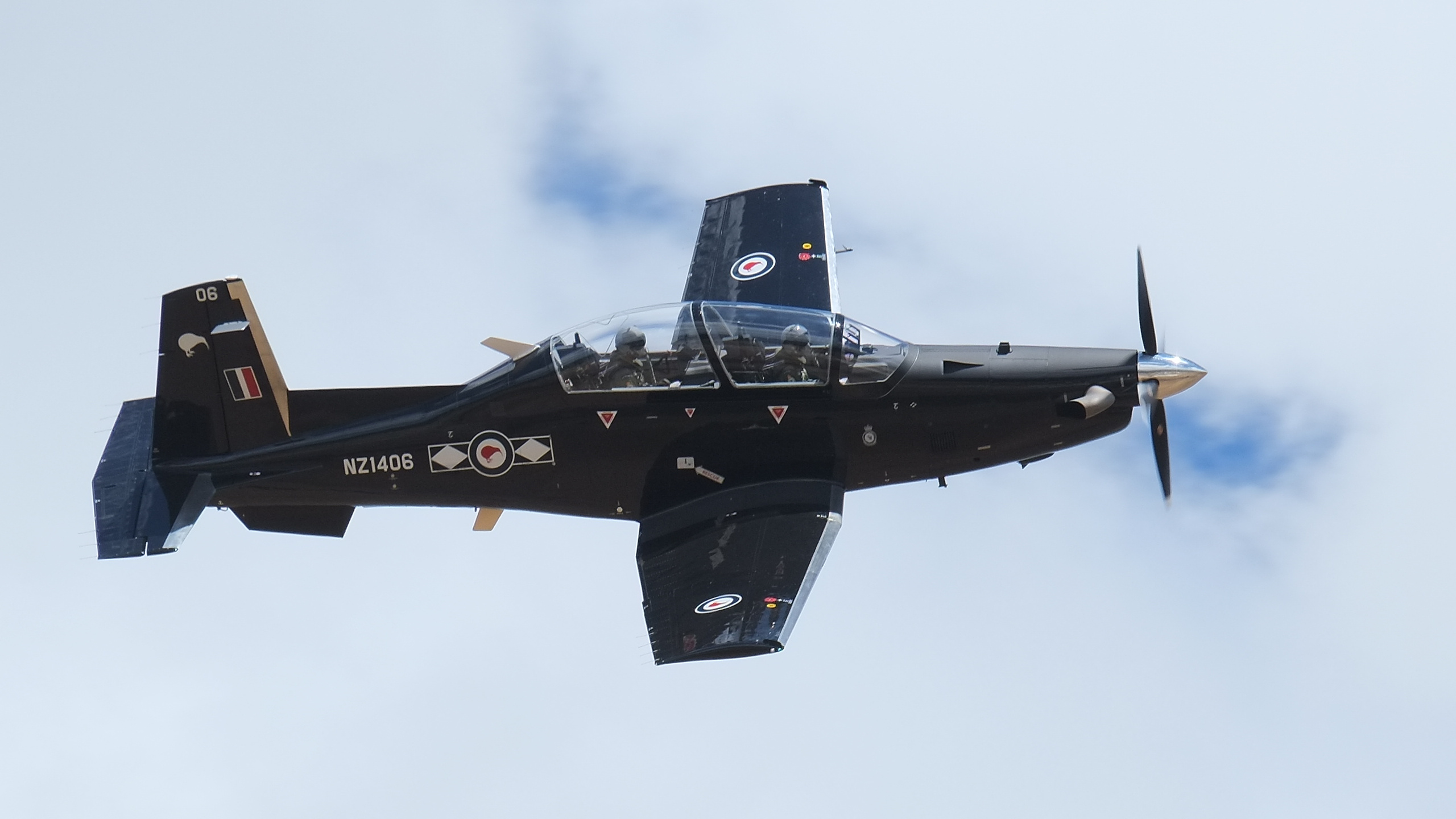
RNZAF T-6 Texan II

In 2015 the Airtrainers were being phased out of service with the introduction of the Beechcraft T-6 Texan II. In March 2015 the School came under command of the re-introduced position of Base Commander Ohakea, with the disestablishment of No. 488 Wing.

In March 2022 the Air Force Heritage Flight of New Zealand was established as part of the Central Flying School.
