= RNZAF Security Forces =

- Active: Air Security Police (2000–2009); Force Protection (2010–2015); Security Forces (2016–Present)
- Country: New Zealand
- Branch: Royal New Zealand Air Force
- Type: Air Force Infantry
- Role: Base Security
- Size: 60 personnel
- Part of: New Zealand Defence Force
- Garrison/HQ: RNZAF Base Auckland
- Colours: Blue and Green
- Engagements: East Timor, Solomon Islands, Operation Enduring Freedom, Iraq
- Website: www.airforce.mil.nz

Insignia
- Patch: Ruru (native owl) with a Maori Powhenua on a green and blue background

RNZAF Security Forces is the Royal New Zealand Air Force unit responsible for base security, ground defence, weapons training, and Air Transport Security on RNZAF aircraft. RNZAF Security Forces operates under the RNZAF Operations Squadron.

RNZAF Security Forces are more commonly known in the RNZAF simply as SECFOR. They have a similar role to other Air Force units such as USAF Security Forces, RAAF Security Force Squadrons, and the RAF Regiment however it is significantly smaller in size compared to their UK, American and Australian counterparts. The primary role of RNZAF Security Forces is to provide the Air Force with security of aircraft and personnel, as well as protection of airfields.

== History ==
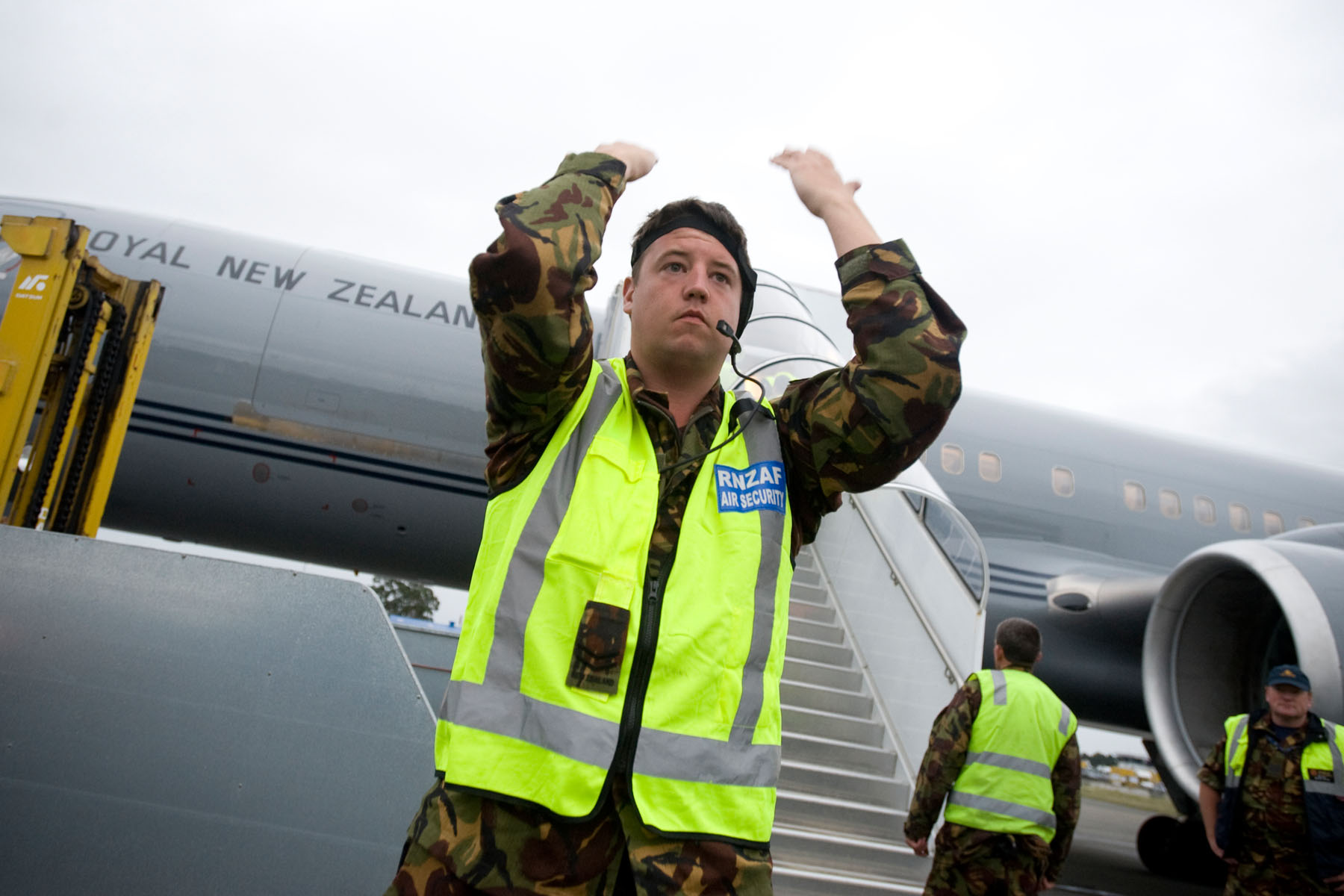
A RNZAF Force Protection corporal in 2011

=== Air Security Police ===
In 1999–2001 many areas of the Air Force underwent significant change, cost saving and disbandment. The RNZAF Police was no exception and in a controversial move this saw the amalgamation of general service instructors (GSIs) with the RNZAF Police; subsequently many RNZAF Police and GSIs left the service shortly after the amalgamation.

The RNZAF moved away from a sole focused policing role, and specialised more in ground defence and base security with policing as a secondary service. A name change to Air Security Police was adopted and the new unit was deployed to East Timor in 1999/2000. However, this proved to be an inauspicious start for the new trade that ended with the Air Security deployment being the subject of a court of inquiry. This inquiry found severe organisational and management problems stemming from a lack of leadership and resentment towards the amalgamation of the two trades. Underlying issues of direction, focus and responsibilities continued to dog the new trade for several years.

=== Force Protection ===
In 2010 following the civilianisation of many trades in the RNZAF the Air Security trade were also to be changed to force protection. This signified the end of many policing roles. Instead an investigation service was provided and a new focus primarily on providing security services to the RNZAF.

On 1 December 2014 all Military Police duties were removed from Force Protection and taken over by the newly established New Zealand Defence Force Military Police.

== See also ==
- United States -USAF Security Forces
- United Kingdom -Royal Air Force Regiment
- Australia -RAAF Airfield Defence Guards
- Germany -German Air Force Regiment
