= Beechcraft T-6 Texan II =

Single-engine, low-wing tandem-seat turboprop military training aircraft

T-6 Texan II AT-6 Wolverine
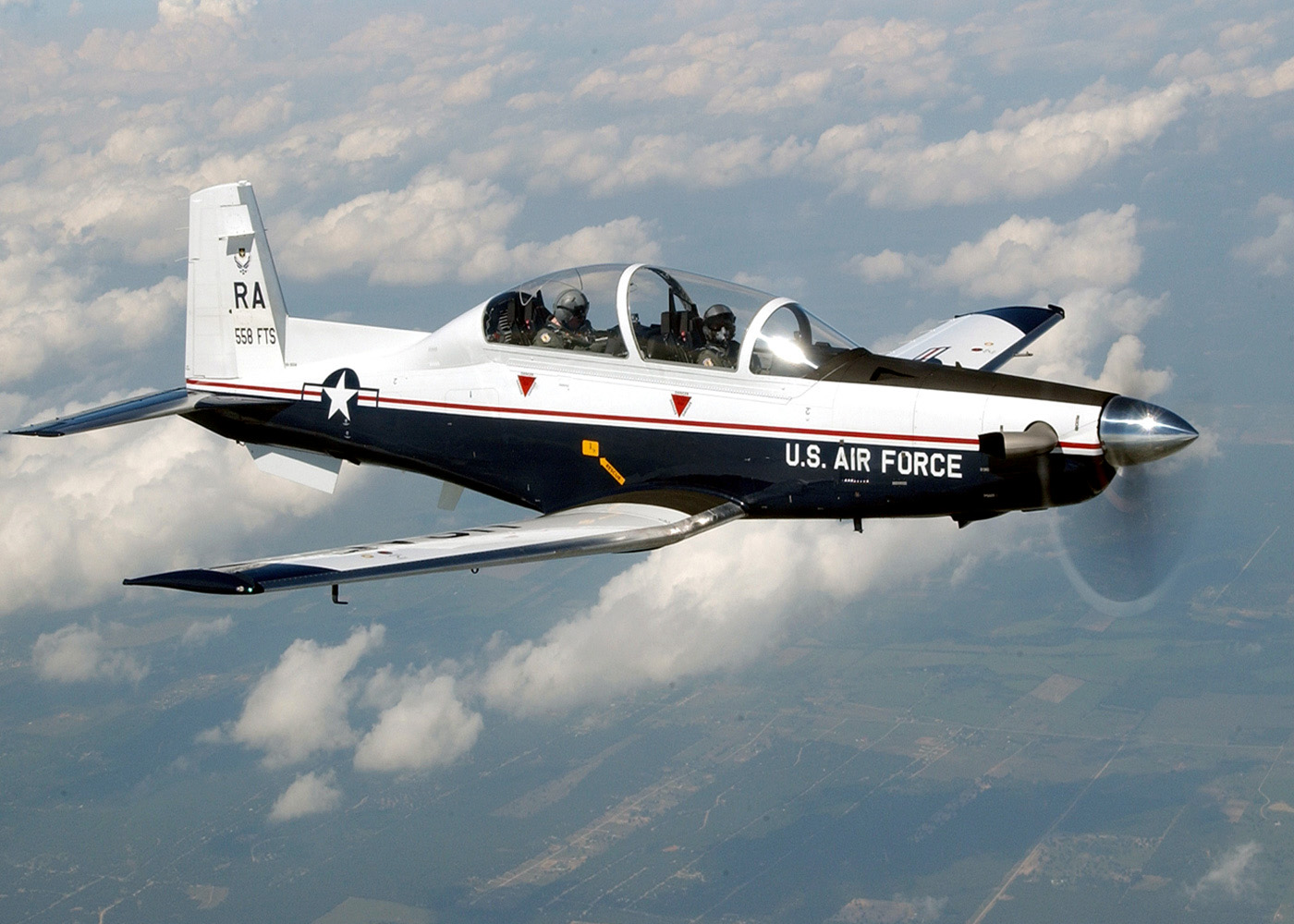
- A USAF T-6A Texan II flying from Randolph Air Force Base

General information
- Type: T-6: Trainer aircraft AT-6: Light attack aircraft
- National origin: United States
- Manufacturer: Textron Aviation
- Status: In service
- Primary users: United States Air Force United States Navy; Royal Canadian Air Force; Hellenic Air Force
- Number built: 900 (August 2015)

History
- Manufactured: 2000–present
- Introduction date: 2001
- First flight: 15 July 1998
- Developed from: Pilatus PC-9

The Beechcraft T-6 Texan II is a single-engined, turboprop aircraft currently built by Textron Aviation, formerly manufactured by Raytheon Aircraft Company, which sold to Textron in 2007. It is a license-built Pilatus PC-9, a trainer aircraft. The T-6 replaced the United States Air Force's Cessna T-37B Tweet and the United States Navy's T-34C Turbo Mentor during the 2010s.

The T-6A is used by the United States Air Force for basic pilot training and combat systems officer training, the United States Navy for primary and intermediate naval flight officer training for the United States Navy and United States Marine Corps, and by the Royal Canadian Air Force (CT-156 Harvard II designation), Greek Air Force, Israeli Air Force (with the "Efroni" nickname), and Iraqi Air Force for basic flight training. The T-6B is used by the US Navy for primary naval aviator training Navy, Marine Corps, and Coast Guard. The T-6C is used for training by the Mexican Air Force, Royal Air Force, Royal Moroccan Air Force, and Royal New Zealand Air Force.

== Design and development ==
The Model 3000/T-6 is a low-wing, cantilever monoplane with enclosed tandem seating. It is powered by a single Pratt and Whitney Canada PT6A-68 turboprop engine in tractor configuration with an aluminum, 97-inch (8.1 ft; 2.5 m), four-blade, constant-speed, variable pitch, nonreversing, feathering propeller assembly and has retractable tricycle landing gear. The aircraft is fitted with Martin-Baker Mark 16 ejection seats and a canopy-fracturing system.

The T-6 is a development of the Pilatus PC-9, modified by Beechcraft to enter the Joint Primary Aircraft Training System (JPATS) competition in the 1990s. A similar arrangement between Pilatus and British Aerospace had also been in place for a Royal Air Force competition in the 1980s, although that competition selected the Short Tucano. The aircraft was designated under the 1962 United States Tri-Service aircraft designation system and named for the decades-earlier T-6 Texan.

On 9 April 2007, the U.S. Department of Defense released its Selected Acquisition Reports, which announced that the T-6 JPATS program was one of only eight programs cited for congressional notification for 25–50% cost overrun over initial estimates, which is referred to as a "Nunn-McCurdy Breach" after the Nunn-McCurdy Amendment. Not often does a program so far into full-rate production experience significant enough cost overruns to trigger this congressional notification.

== Operational history ==
=== United States ===
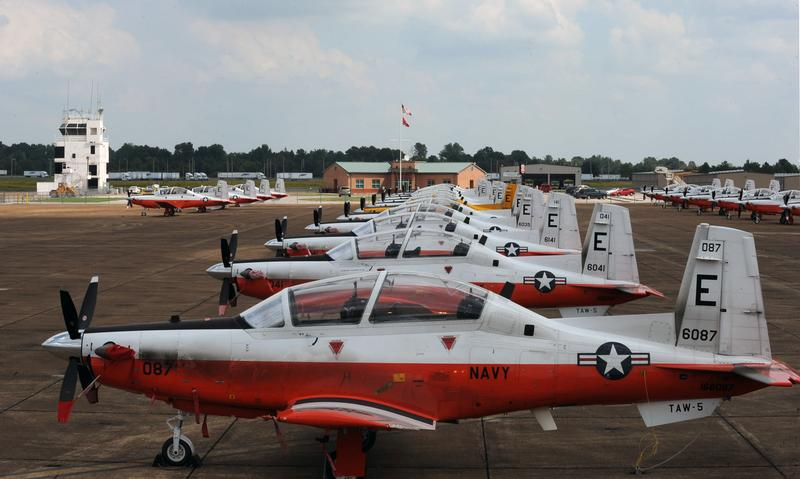
US Navy T-6B Texan IIs from Naval Air Station Whiting Field at Millington-Memphis Airport

The T-6A was introduced to Moody Air Force Base and Randolph Air Force Base in 2000–2001, and the Air Force awarded the full-rate T-6 production contract in December 2001. Laughlin Air Force Base began flying the T-6 in 2003, where it became the primary basic trainer, replacing the T-37. Vance Air Force Base completed transitioning from the T-37 to the T-6 in 2006. That year, Columbus Air Force Base began its transition, and retired its last T-37 in April 2008. The last active USAF T-37Bs were retired at Sheppard Air Force Base in the summer of 2009.

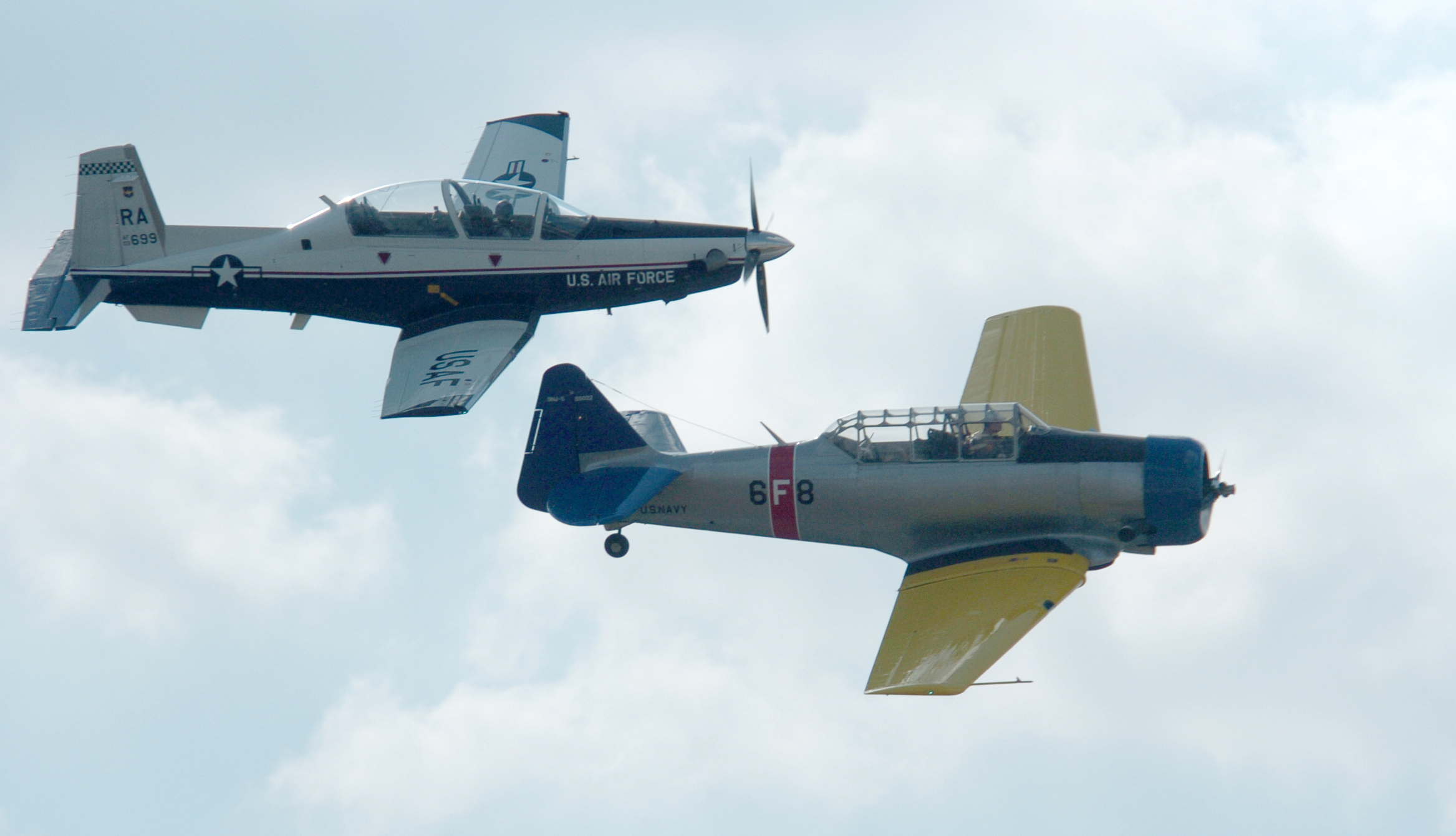
An original, World War II-era T-6A Texan aircraft, right, with the new T-6 Texan II at Randolph AFB, Texas, in 2007

The Texan failed to qualify for the Light Attack/Armed Reconnaissance program, because the USAF mailed the exclusion notice to the wrong address, leaving the company with no time to protest the decision, but the official mail failure gave Hawker-Beechcraft a further legal justification, as they had told the USAF they planned to file a legal challenge even before the official notice had been mailed and brought its considerable political influence to bear against the USAF decision against their candidate, with one Kansas Congressman stating, "It is simply wrong for the Obama administration to hire a Brazilian company to handle national security when we have a qualified and competent American company that can do the job." In 2013, Beechcraft again lost the bid.

In August 2017, the Air Force conducted the "Light Attack Experiment" to evaluate potential light-attack aircraft. Following this, it decided to continue experimenting with two nondevelopmental aircraft, the AT-6 Wolverine derivative of the T-6 Texan II and the Sierra Nevada/Embraer A-29 Super Tucano. Tests were scheduled to be conducted at Davis-Monthan Air Force Base, Arizona, between May and July 2018. The tests were intended "to experiment with maintenance, data networking, and sensors...[to] gather the data needed for a rapid procurement", according to Secretary of the Air Force Heather Wilson. Experimentation was to examine logistics requirements, weapons and sensor issues, and future interoperability with partner forces.

During the last week of January 2018, a cluster of unexplained physiological events involving the T-6 occurred at Columbus, Vance, and Sheppard Air Force Bases. In response, the commander of Nineteenth Air Force, which is responsible for USAF pilot training, directed an "operational pause" in Texan II operations on 1 February 2018 to ensure aircrew safety. The pause was intended to enable the Air Force to "examine the root causes of the incidents, educate and listen to aircrew, [and] develop and deliver mitigation solutions." The Air Force had established a general officer-led team to integrate and co-ordinate efforts across the Air Force to address aircrew's unexplained physiological events earlier in 2018.

In February 2018, the AT-6 Wolverine and the A-29 Super Tucano were named as the only two remaining aircraft in USAF's Light Attack/Armed Reconnaissance aircraft competition.

In March 2020, the USAF placed a $70.2 million order for two AT-6E Wolverine aircraft. The first Wolverine was delivered to the USAF in February 2021. The Wolverines were operated by the 81st Fighter Squadron. In June 2022, the two aircraft were returned to Beechcraft. In July 2022, the Wolverine received military type certification from the USAF. In September 2023, the two Wolverines were transferred from storage at Beechcraft to the United States Naval Test Pilot School.

=== Canada ===
The CT-156 Harvard II is a variant used for pilot instruction in the NATO Flying Training in Canada (NFTC), located at 15 Wing, Moose Jaw, Saskatchewan. They are leased to the Royal Canadian Air Force by the program's administrator, CAE. NFTC's Harvard II aircraft are almost identical in cockpit layout and performance to the American JPATS Texan IIs. Within NFTC, students fly the Harvard II in phases 2 and 3 of the training program, and some were to go on to fly the CT-155 Hawk jet trainer also used by NFTC for phase 4 (Moose Jaw) and phase 5 fighter lead-in training (4 Wing, Cold Lake, Alberta). NFTC had 25 Harvard II aircraft owned and maintained by Bombardier, although one was lost following a nonfatal crash in 2014, and another in 2017. CAE took over the program in 2015.

=== Greece ===
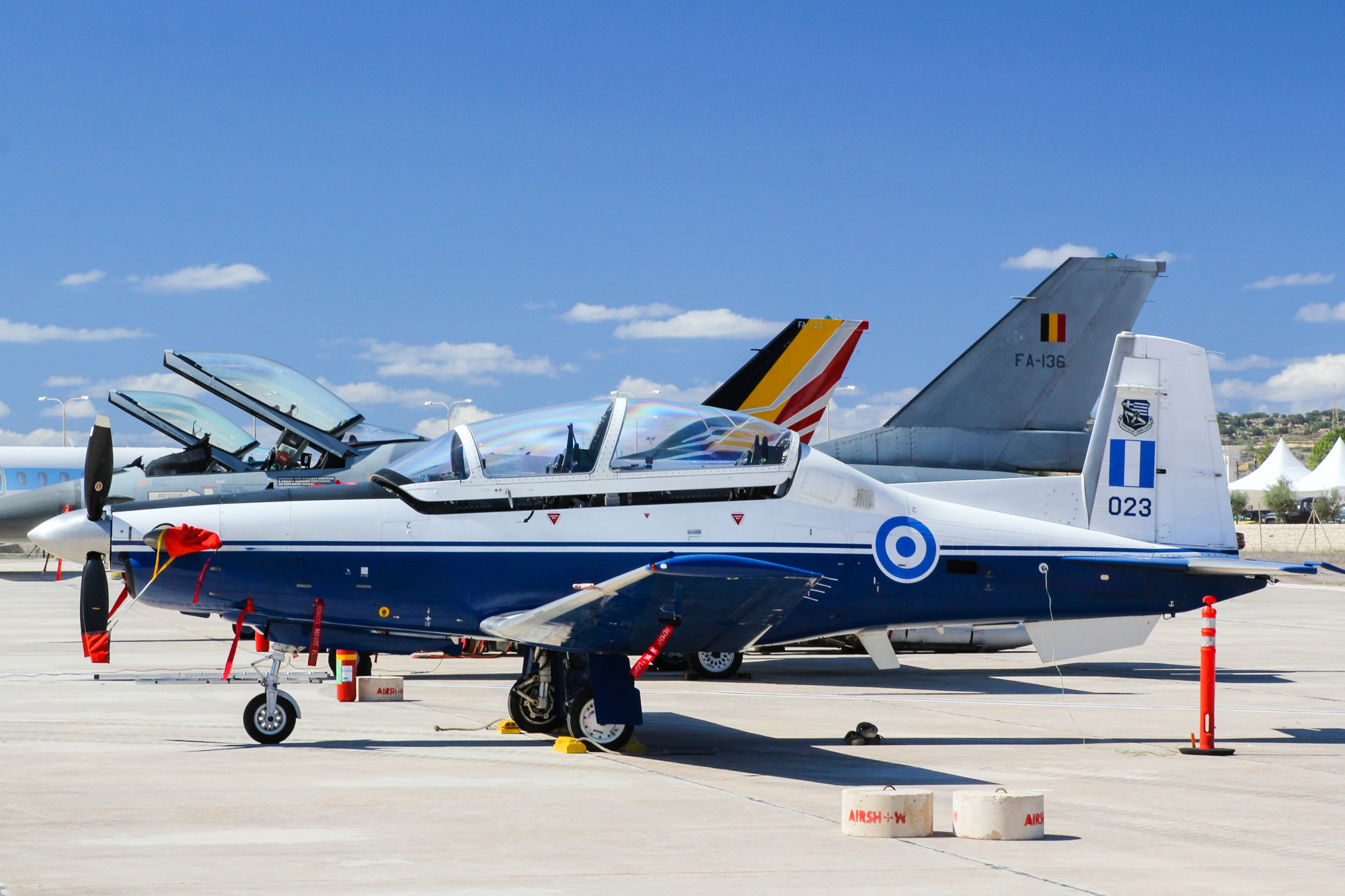
Hellenic Air Force Daedalus Display Team T-6 Texan II at the 2015 Malta International Airshow

The Hellenic Air Force operates 25 T-6A and 20 T-6A NTA aircraft.

=== Israel ===
On 9 June 2008, the Defense Security Cooperation Agency announced a possible foreign military sale to Israel of 25 T-6As for the Israeli Air Force. In July 2009, Beechcraft delivered the first four of 20 T-6As under contract to the Israeli Air Force.

=== Iraq ===
On 16 December 2009, the first four of 15 T-6A aircraft were delivered to Tikrit, Iraq, under a $210 million contract. No AT-6 aircraft were included as was previously reported. The last four T-6As reached Iraq on 9 November 2010.

On 13 May 2014, the US State Department approved an order for 24 T-6C aircraft for use as trainers by the Iraqi Air Force. The sale was worth US$790 million and was part of a larger $1 billion deal.

=== Morocco ===
In October 2009, Hawker Beechcraft announced the sale of 24 T-6Cs for the Royal Moroccan Air Force.

=== Mexico ===
On 9 January 2012, Mexico purchased six T-6C+ aircraft for the Mexican Air Force to begin replacing their Pilatus PC-7 trainers. On 24 October 2013, Hawker Beechcraft announced a follow-on order of an additional six T-6C+ aircraft for the Mexican Air Force, bringing the total ordered to 12. The Mexican Navy also ordered two T-6C+ trainers in March 2014.

=== New Zealand ===
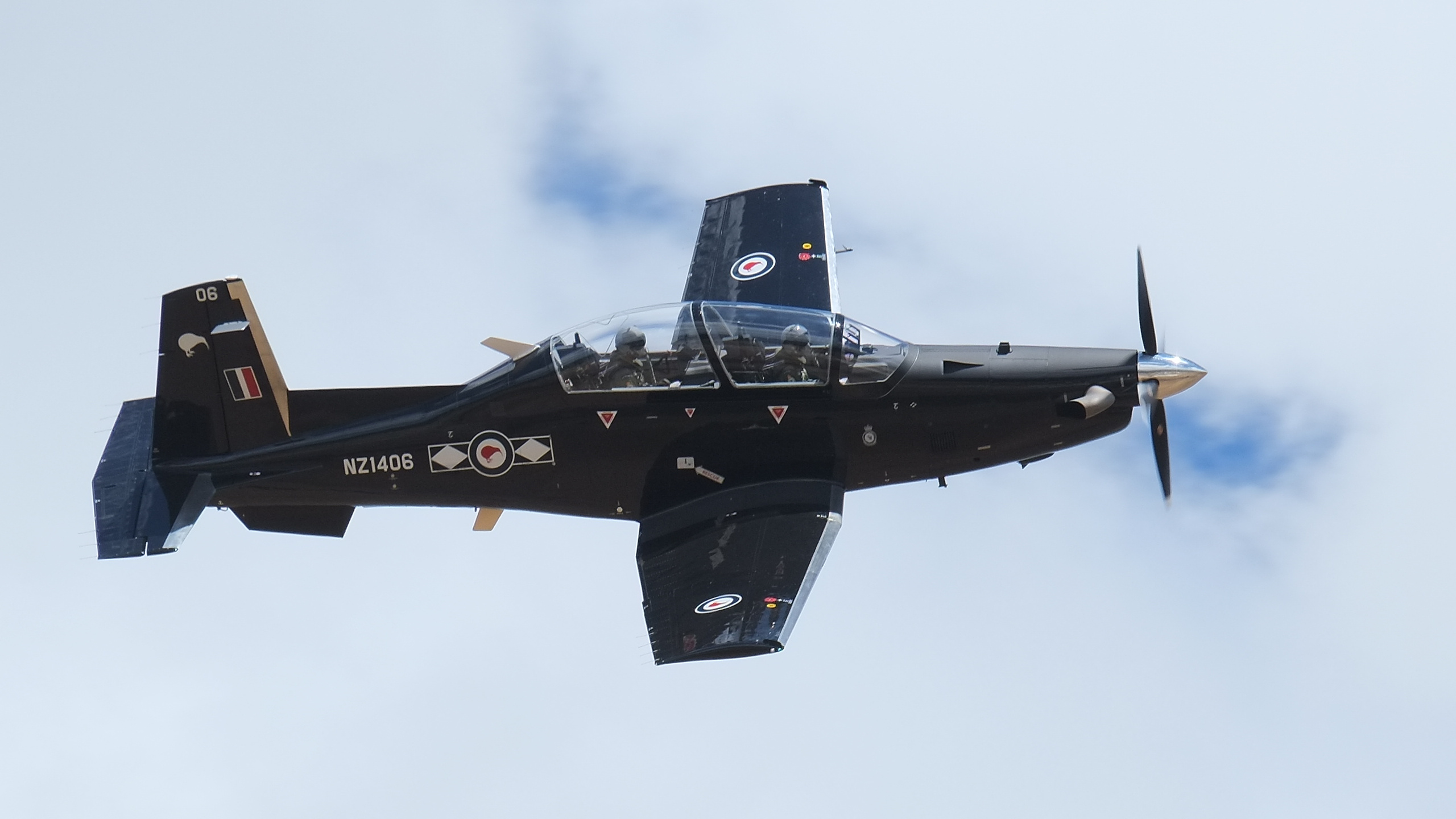
A RNZAF Texan II

The New Zealand government announced the purchase of 11 T-6Cs for the Royal New Zealand Air Force for NZ$154 million, on 27 January 2014, to replace the PAC CT/4 Airtrainer, with all aircraft delivered by February 2015. The first training course using the type began early 2016. The T-6Cs are expected to remain in service with the RNZAF for 30 years.

=== United Kingdom ===
On 24 October 2014, the UK Ministry of Defence announced its preferred bidder for the UK Military Flying Training System programme. Ascent's system will involve T-6C Texan IIs in the basic trainer role for both Royal Air Force and Royal Navy pilots. The contract for ten aircraft was signed by Affinity Flying Training Services and Beechcraft Defense on 4 February 2016. The T-6C trainers have replaced Short Tucano T1 aircraft.

=== Argentina ===
In October 2017, the Argentine Air Force received the first four of 12 T-6C+ aircraft purchased from Textron Aviation and a further two in June 2018.

=== Tunisia ===
In October 2019, U.S. State Department approved the possible foreign military sale of 12 T-6Cs to Tunisia at an estimated cost of $234 million (~$290 million in 2025), including related spares, ground support equipment, and support. The sale is intended to provide replacement for the aging trainer fleet of Tunisian Air Force and to train pilots for counterterrorism and border-security missions.

=== Japan ===
In December 2024, the Japanese Air Self-Defense Force announced it had selected the T-6 to replace its aging Fuji T-7 trainer aircraft. In January 2025, Textron released a statement confirming the sale. Initially, the T-6C variant reportedly was chosen, but the order was actually for the T-6JP, an export version specifically for Japan. The number of aircraft ordered has not been revealed, but is speculated to be fewer than 49. The deal also includes ground-based training systems, training for airmen, and long-term support for operations.

== Variants ==
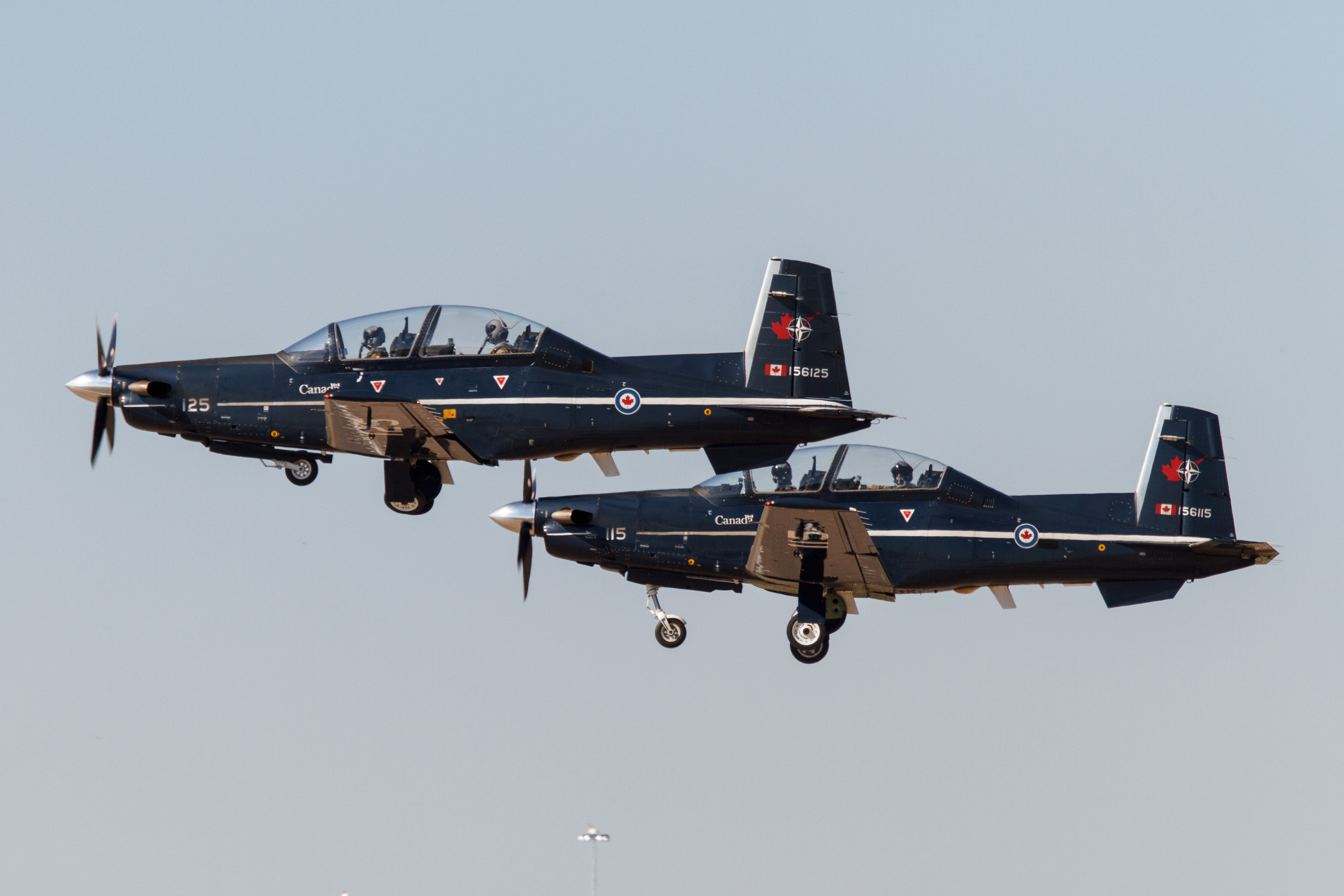
Two RCAF CT-156 Harvard II at the Alliance Air Show in 2014.

Model 3000
Company designation

T-6A Texan II
Standard version used by the USAF, the USN for Naval Flight Officer (NFO) training at Naval Air Station Pensacola, and the Hellenic Air Force (25).

T-6A NTA Texan II
Armed version of the T-6A for the HAF (20). T-6A NTA has the capability to carry rocket pods, gun pods, external fuel tanks, and bombs. NTA stands for New Trainer Aircraft.

T-6B Texan II
Upgraded version of the T-6A with a digital glass cockpit that includes a Head-Up Display (HUD), six multi-function displays (MFD) and Hands on Throttle And Stick (HOTAS), used by the USN for Navy, Marine Corps and Coast Guard Naval Aviator training at Naval Air Station Whiting Field and Naval Air Station Corpus Christi; and at the United States Naval Test Pilot School.

AT-6B Wolverine
Initial armed version of the T-6B for primary weapons training or light attack roles. It has the same digital cockpit, but upgraded to include datalink and integrated electro-optical sensors along with several weapons configurations. Engine power is increased to 1,600 shp (1,200 kW) with the Pratt & Whitney Canada PT6-68D engine, and the structure is reinforced.

T-6C Texan II
Upgraded version of the T-6B with wing hard points, primarily designated for export sales.

T-6D Texan II
Version based on T-6B and C for the US Army for operational support, testing, utility, and chase plane roles.

AT-6E Wolverine
Production armed version of the T-6 for primary weapons training or light attack roles.

T-6TH Texan II
Version of the T-6C for the Royal Thai Air Force. Locally designated B.F.22 (Thai: บ.ฝ.๒๒).

T-6JP Texan II
Version of the T-6 for the Japanese Air Self Defense Force to replace Fuji T-7 trainers.

AT-6TH Wolverine
Version of the AT-6E for the Royal Thai Air Force. Originally locally designated B.JF.22 (Thai: บ.จฝ.๒๒), later changed to B.J.8 (Thai: บ.จ.๘).

CT-156 Harvard II
Version of the T-6A for NFTC with the Canadian Forces. Nearly identical to standard USAF and USN in terms of avionics, cockpit layout, and performance.

== Operators ==
Beechcraft T-6 Texan II aircraft operators

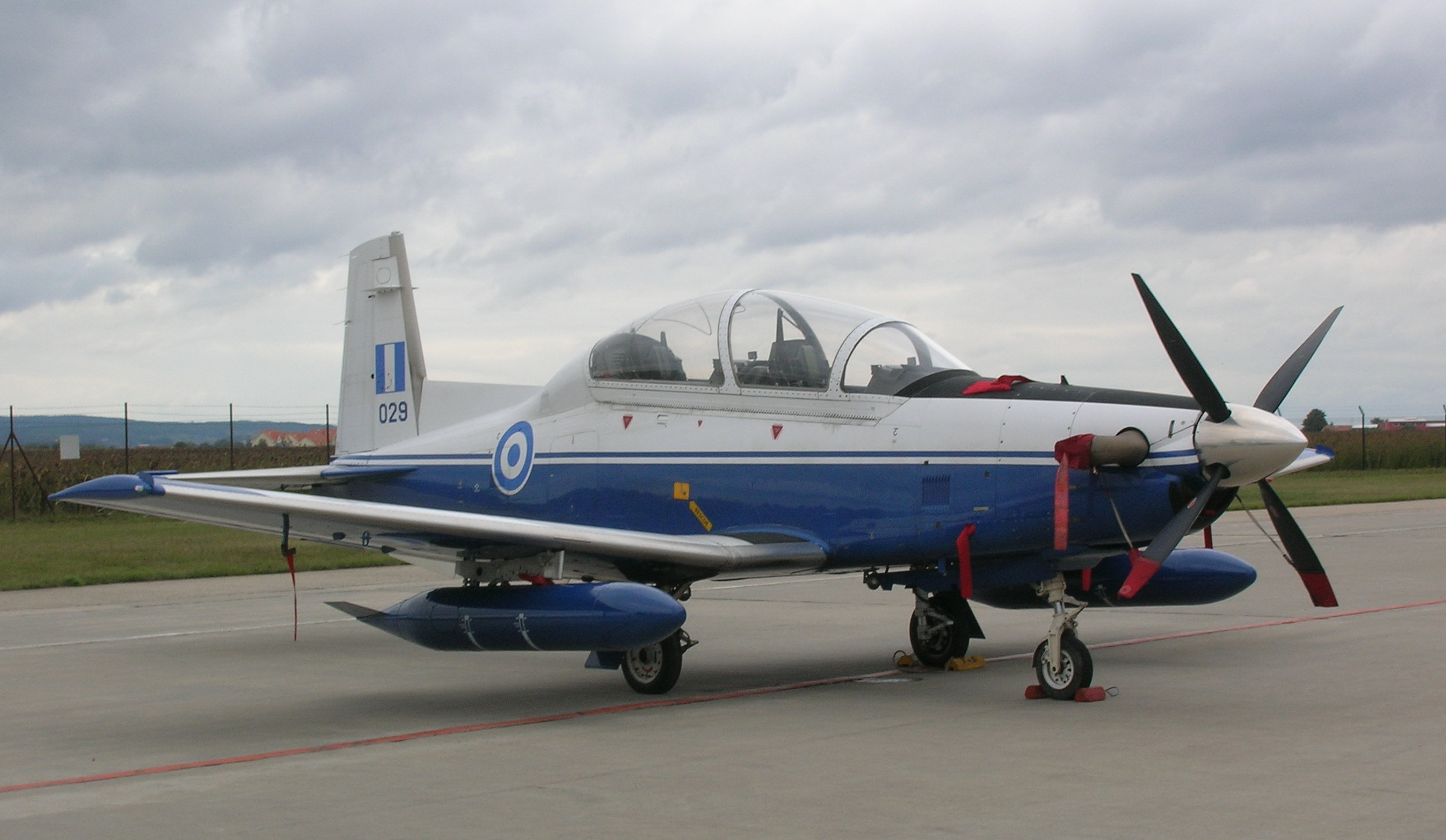
A Hellenic Air Force T-6A Texan II during CIAF in Brno

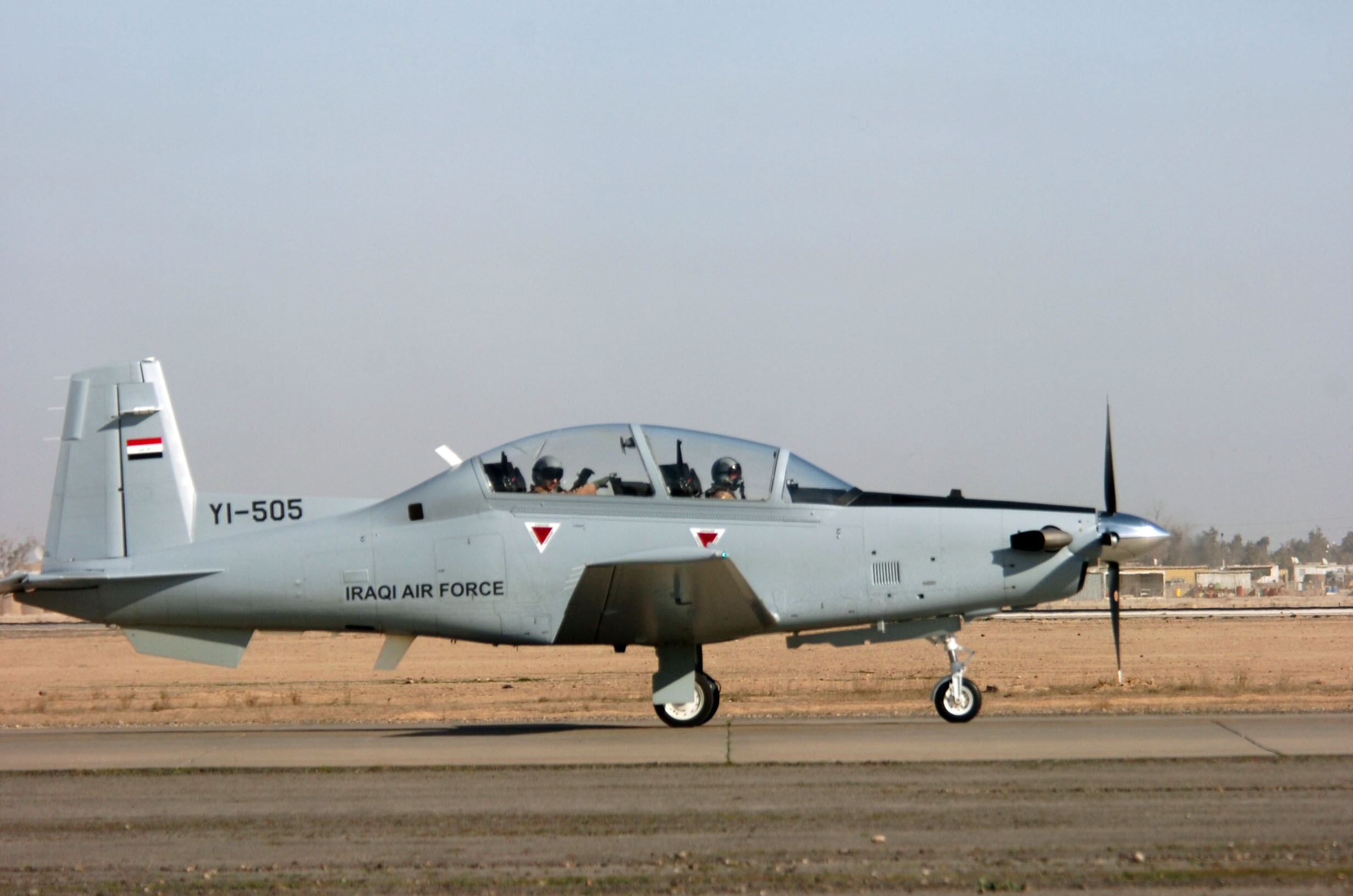
An Iraqi Air Force T-6A Texan II

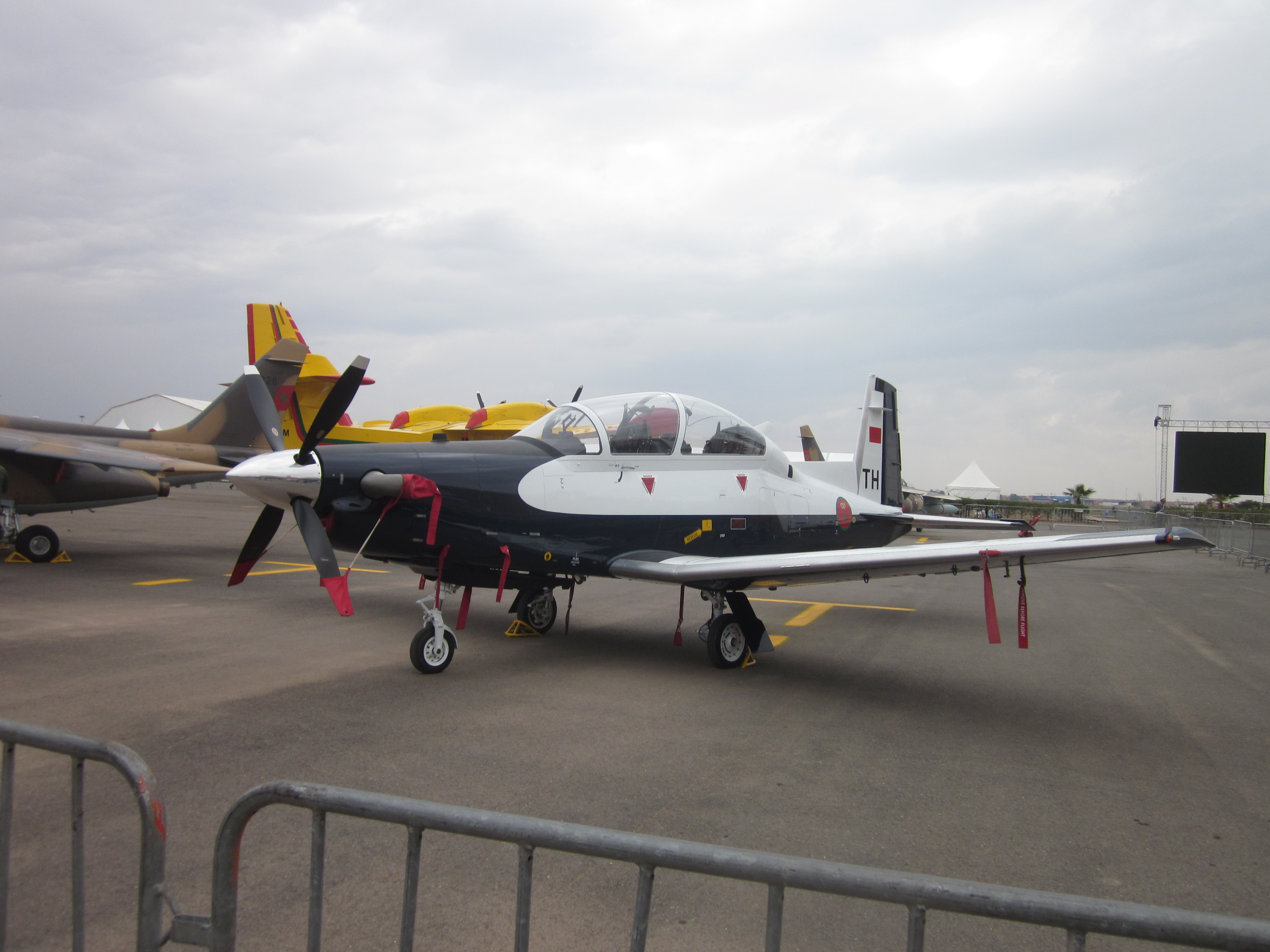
A Royal Moroccan Air Force T-6C Texan II during Marrakech Air Show

Argentina

- Argentine Air Force – 12 T-6C+ on order, six delivered as of June 2018.

Canada

- Royal Canadian Air Force - 26 aircraft operated from CFB Moose Jaw, Saskatchewan
  - 2 Canadian Forces Flying Training School – 26 CT-156 Harvard IIs for pilot training.

Colombia

- Colombian Aerospace Force - 10 on order, six delivered as of December 2023.

Greece

- Hellenic Air Force 45 T-6A

Iraq

- Iraqi Air Force

Israel

- Israeli Air Force 20 T-6A

Mexico

- Mexican Air Force 6 T-6C+ delivered in 2012. A follow-on order for 6 more planes was made, due for delivery in late 2013.
- Mexican Navy

Morocco

- Royal Moroccan Air Force 24 T-6Cs in service as of January 2012.

New Zealand

- Royal New Zealand Air Force – 11 T-6C operated from RNZAF Base Ohakea, Manawatu
  - No. 14 Squadron – Pilot training
  - Central Flying School – Qualified Flight Instructor training
  - Black Falcons – Aerobatic display team

Thailand

- Royal Thai Air Force - $162 million order placed in 2020 for 12 designated the T-6TH. Delivery scheduled for late 2022 and early 2023. $143 million order placed in 2021 for 8 AT-6 Wolverines designated AT-6TH to be delivered from 2024.

Tunisia

- Tunisian Air Force
  - No. 13 Squadron

United Kingdom

- Royal Air Force
  - RAF Valley, Anglesey, Wales
    - No. 72 Squadron – 14 Texan T1s for Basic Fast Jet Training.

United States

- United States Air Force
  - Air Education and Training Command
- United States Army 4 T-6D Texan II as of January 2025
  - Redstone Arsenal, Huntsville, Alabama
- United States Navy
  - Naval Air Training Command
  - Naval Air Warfare Center
    - United States Naval Test Pilot School - 2 former USAF AT-6E Wolverine.

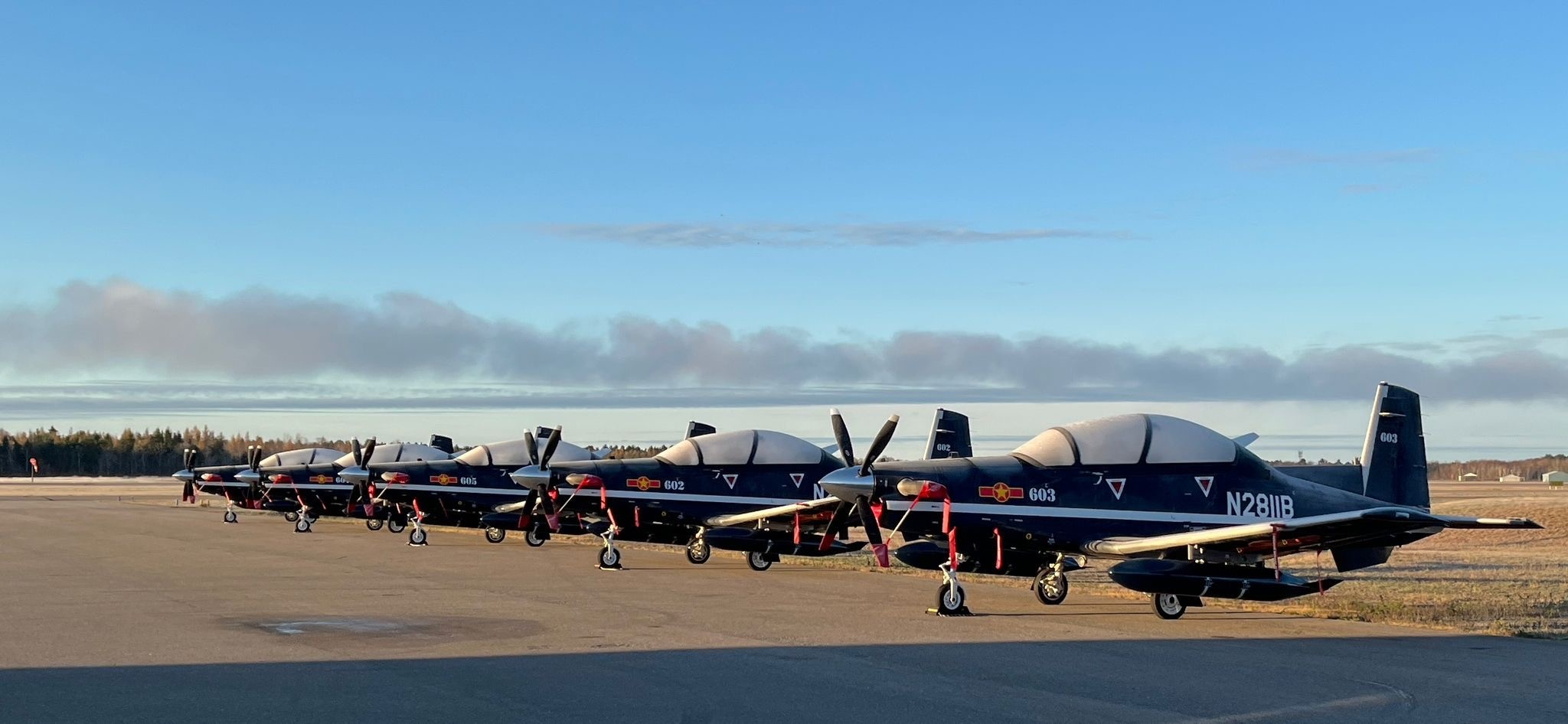
A line of Vietnamese T-6C on their delivery.

Vietnam

- Vietnam People's Air Force (Air Force Officer's College)- All 12 T-6C aircraft have arrived in Vietnam, with the last batch of three landing at Tan Son Nhat Airport on September 22nd, 2025. They will be transferred to the 920th Air Force Regiment.

=== Future Operators ===
Japan

- Japanese Air Self-Defense Force - Unspecified number ordered, likely to enter service before 2030.

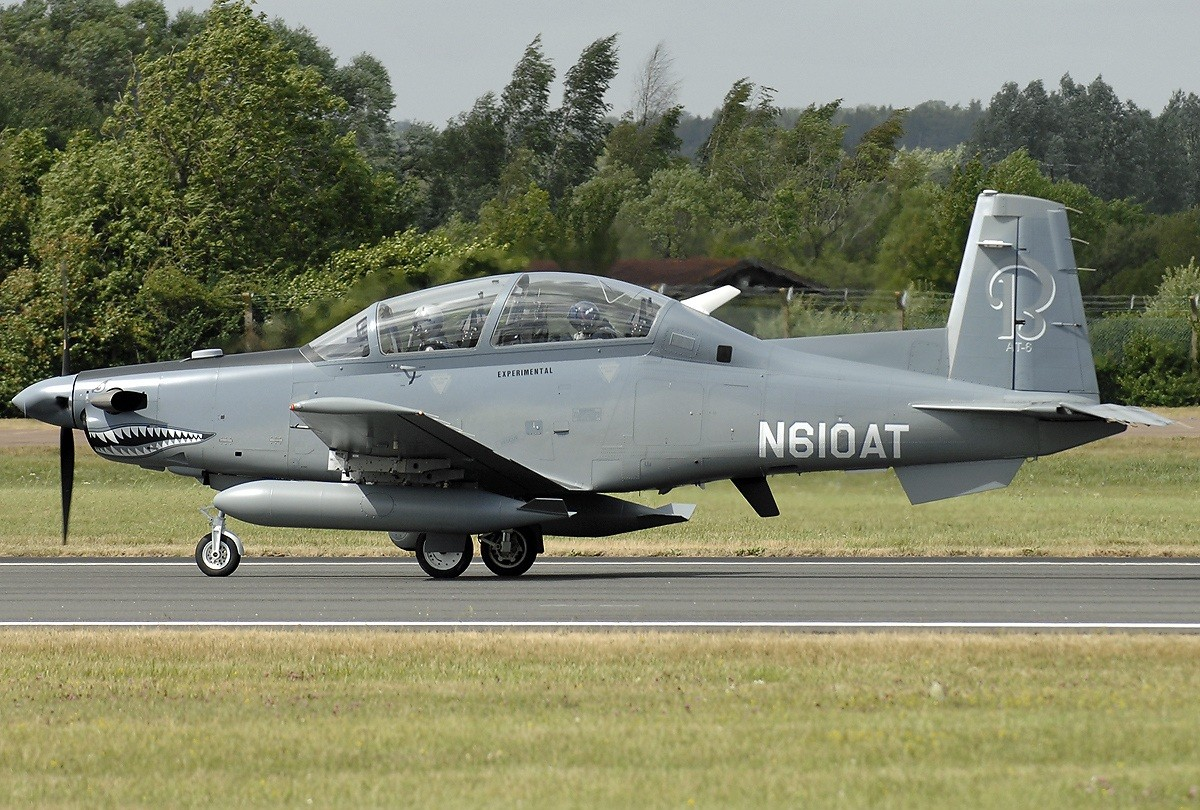
An AT-6B at RIAT 2010

== Incidents ==
- September 18, 2018: A T-6 Texan crashed on landing due to an incorrectly assembled engine. Both pilots were able to eject safely.
- October 23, 2020: Navy LT Rhiannon Ross and Coast Guard ENS Morgan Garrett died on impact when they crashed their T-6 in a residential area near Foley, Alabama. Causes for the accident were unclear.
- July 27, 2022: The U.S. military grounded hundreds of T-6 Texan IIs after concerns about a potential defect in the cartridge actuated devices used to initiate the plane's ejection seats.
- May 13, 2024: A U.S. Air Force flight instructor died after sustaining critical injuries when the ejection seat in his T-6 Texan II activated while the aircraft was on the ground. The investigation concluded that the mishap occurred due to the instructor accidentally pulling the ejection handle while not being strapped to the parachute. This resulted in the instructor falling headfirst from a height of 100 ft (30 m).
- January 28, 2026: A Royal Thai Air Force AT-6 Texan crashed. 2 fatalities have been reported and the accident is under investigation.

== Specifications (T-6A) ==
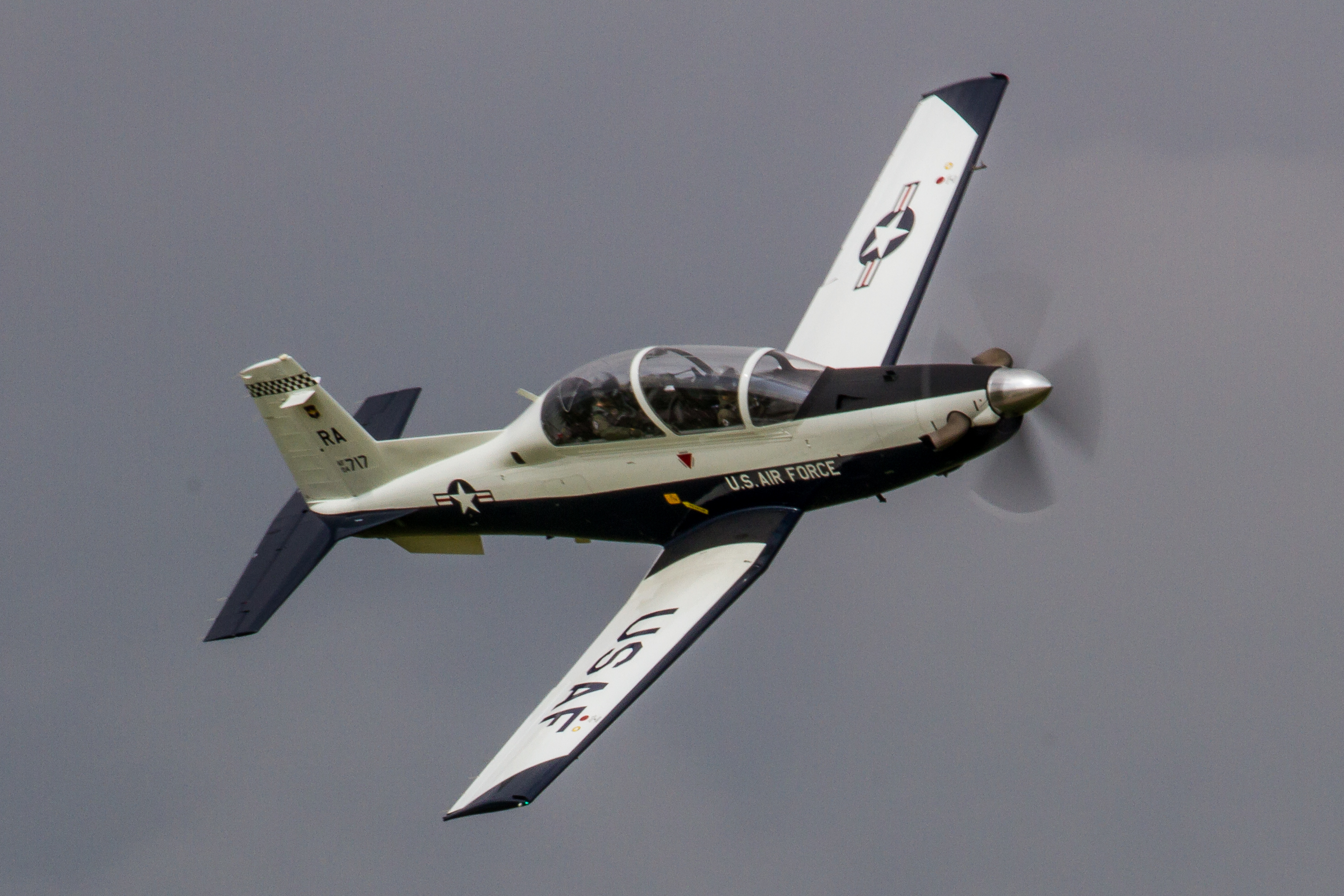
A T-6 Texan II at Take to the Skies Airfest 2016

Data from Global Security, USAF, EASA and USN

General characteristics

- Crew: Two
- Capacity: Two
- Length: 33 ft 4 in (10.16 m)
- Wingspan: 33 ft 5 in (10.19 m)
- Height: 10 ft 8 in (3.25 m)
- Wing area: 177.5 sq ft (16.49 m^{2})
- Aspect ratio: 6.29:1
- Empty weight: 4,707 lb (2,135 kg)
- Gross weight: 6,300 lb (2,858 kg)
- Max takeoff weight: 6,500 lb (2,948 kg)
- Fuel capacity: 149.0 Imp gal (677.5 liters, 1200 lb)
- Powerplant: 1 × Pratt & Whitney Canada PT6A-68 turboprop, 1,100 shp (820 kW)
- Propellers: 4-bladed Hartzell HC-E4A-2 Hub with E9612 blades, 8 ft 1 in (2.46 m) diameter

Performance

- Cruise speed: 320 mph (510 km/h, 280 kn)
- Never exceed speed: 364 mph (586 km/h, 316 kn)
- Range: 1,000 mi (1,700 km, 900 nmi)
- Service ceiling: 31,000 ft (9,400 m)
- g limits: +7.0g/−3.5g

== See also ==
Related development

- Pilatus PC-9

Aircraft of comparable role, configuration, and era

- Embraer EMB 314 Super Tucano
- Fuji T-7
- HAL HTT-40
- Pilatus PC-21
- KAI KT-1
- PZL-130 Orlik
- Short Tucano
- TAI Hürkuş
- Hongdu Yakovlev CJ-7
- UTVA Kobac

Related lists

- List of active Canadian military aircraft
- List of active United States military aircraft
