= RNZAF Base Ohakea =

RNZAF Base Ohakea Defensio Per Vires

- IATA: OHA; ICAO: NZOH

Summary
- Airport type: Military
- Owner: New Zealand Defence Force
- Operator: Royal New Zealand Air Force
- Location: Bulls, New Zealand
- Occupants: No. 3 Squadron RNZAF; No. 5 Squadron RNZAF; No. 14 Squadron RNZAF; No. 42 Squadron RNZAF
- Elevation AMSL: 164 ft (50 m)
- Coordinates: 40°12′22″S 175°23′16″E
- Website: www.airforce.mil.nz

Map
- Interactive map of RNZAF Base Ohakea

Runways
Direction	Length		Surface
Direction	ft	m	Surface
09/27	8,021	2,445	Asphalt
09L/27R	1,887	575	Grass
09R/27L	2,369	722	Grass
15/33	6,998	2,133	Asphalt
11/29	2,638	804	Grass
05/23	1,837	560	Grass

RNZAF Base Ohakea is an operational base of the Royal New Zealand Air Force. Opened in 1939, it is located near Bulls, 25 km north-west of Palmerston North in the Manawatū. It is also used as an alternative airport for civilian aircraft. The base's motto is Defensio per vires (Latin for defence through strength).

== Early days ==
An air base was originally proposed in the area in 1927, when Ohakea was selected as the most suitable site for a mooring mast for airships of the British Imperial Airship service. It was proposed to build one mast for a demonstration flight, with the potential for expansion to a full airship base with three masts, airship sheds and hydrogen production. However, there was no point in going ahead with the development of the site without a commitment from the Australian Government to build masts to provide bases in that country. When the Australian Government declined to build masts, the New Zealand Government declined likewise.

== 1930s development ==
In 1935 the Labour government committed to an expansion of the military air service at the expense of the navy, seeing this as a way of reducing the total defence vote. At the end of 1935, the government accepted an air service expansion plan developed by RAF Wing Commander Ralph Cochrane.

The plan called for several new bases, with a major development at Ohakea, which would be home to 30 Wellington bombers on order for the RNZAF. Two large hangars (now hangars 2 and 3) were authorised to house the aircraft, to be designed by the Department of Public Works chief design engineer Charles Turner. Turner decided to build the hangars as monolithic reinforced concrete structures because structural steel could not be obtained in sufficient quantities without delays, while concrete and reinforcing steel could be delivered immediately. The same limitation forced Turner to adopt concrete doors. The arched hangars spanned 61 metres, with a height of 18 metres. The expense of the steel centring was spread across four hangars, as another two similar structures were ordered for RNZAF Base Auckland. The two Ohakea hangars were completed in 1939, at a cost of about £76,750 each.

Ultimately, the Wellington bombers for which the hangars were built never arrived, as they were donated to Britain at the start of the Second World War, forming The New Zealand Squadron. However, the hangars have been in continuous use since their construction, and (re-roofed in steel) remain in use today.

== Military service ==
During the Second World War, Ohakea was the RNZAF's main training base for operational conversion to fighters, observers/navigators for medium bombers and air gunners. After the war, No. 14 Squadron RNZAF, No. 42 Squadron RNZAF and No. 75 Squadron RNZAF were re-formed at Ohakea, and No.1 Repair Depot relocated from RNZAF Base Te Rapa in Hamilton, New Zealand.

In August 1966 No. 1 Flying Training School RNZAF at Wigram was renamed Pilot Training Squadron (PTS).

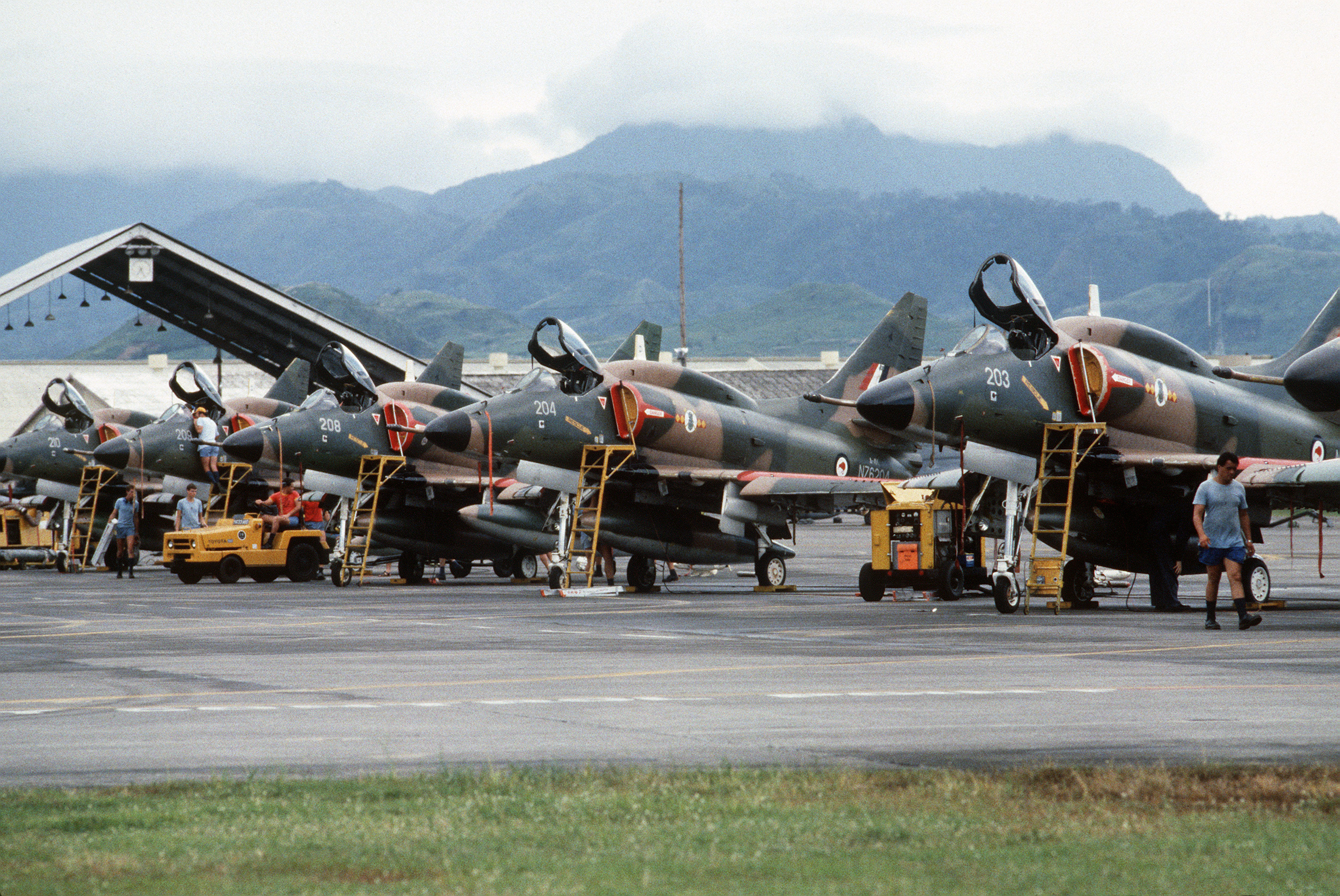
RNZAF A-4Ks at Clark Air Base, 1984

After the war, Ohakea was the RNZAF's strike base, with Nos 14 and 75 Squadrons resident. A long-time resident, No 42 Squadron relocated to Whenuapai in 1984 to allow the relocation of 2 Squadron RNZAF to HMAS Albatross, Nowra, Australia in 1991. In 1993, RNZAF flying training previously carried out at Wigram by the Pilot Training Squadron RNZAF and the Central Flying School RNZAF moved to Ohakea. Also in 1993 a new aviation wing of the Royal New Zealand Air Force Museum was opened at Ohakea. 14 Squadron and 75 Squadron disbanded in November 2001, and 42 Squadron relocated back to Ohakea in January 2002. There are currently around 1200 personnel based at Ohakea, which makes it the second largest Air Force base behind RNZAF Base Auckland.

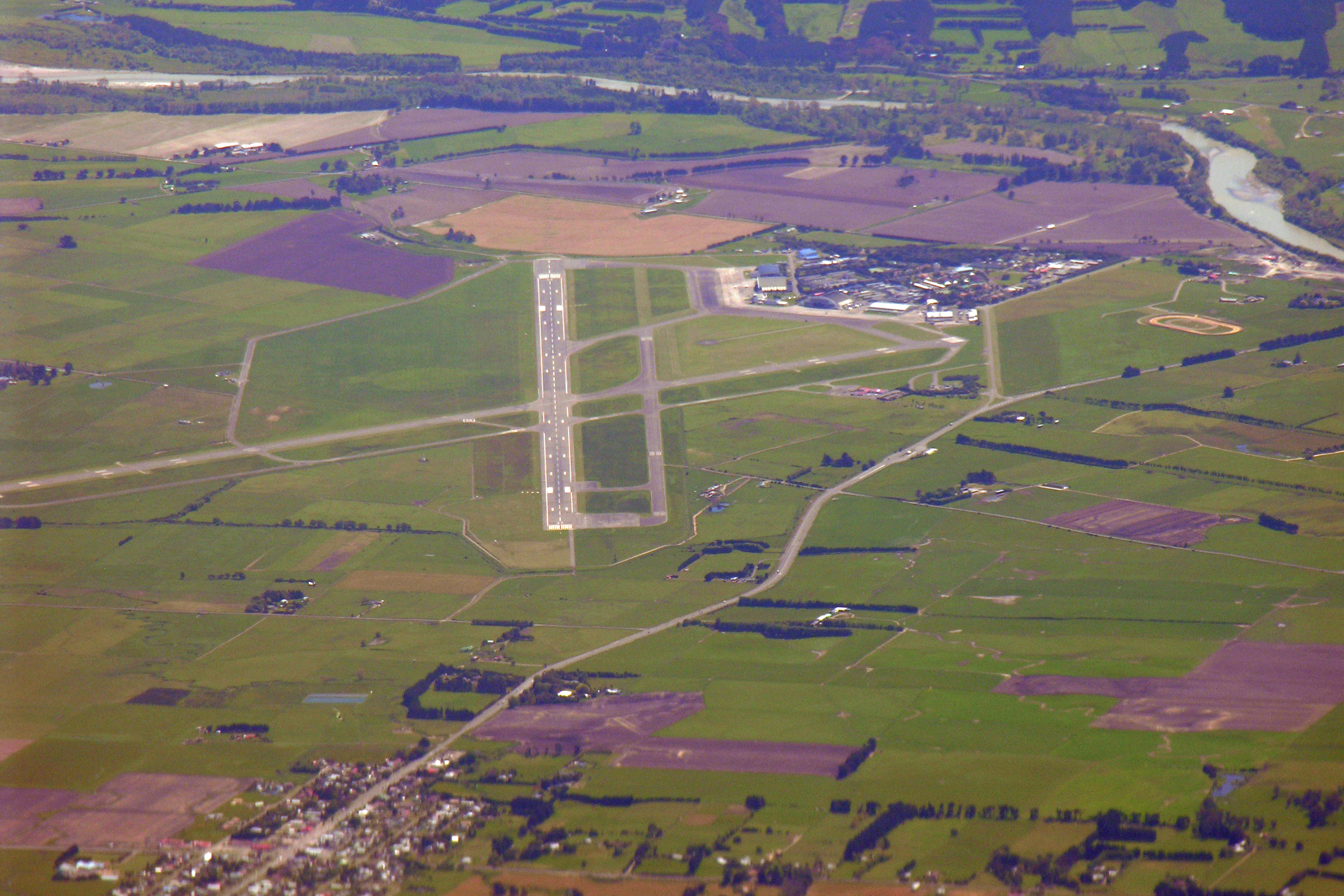
RNZAF Base Ohakea in 2005, before Sqd 3 and 5 hangar developments

A plan to consolidate all RNZAF operations at Ohakea was abandoned in March 2009 as part of a change of policy on the part of the incoming National Government who chose to retain two operational air bases, Ohakea and Whenuapai, for use by the RNZAF.

In 2012 following the arrival of NH-90 and A-109 helicopters a new multi-purpose hangar was built to accommodate the 3 Squadron helicopter fleet. Another significant infrastructure has included a brand new main gate duty centre which the RNZAF Police and RNZAF Security Forces personnel occupy, an international air movements terminal named after Sir Richard Bolt which was completed in 2014. This allows Ohakea the ability to accommodate international civilian flights if Wellington Airport was closed.

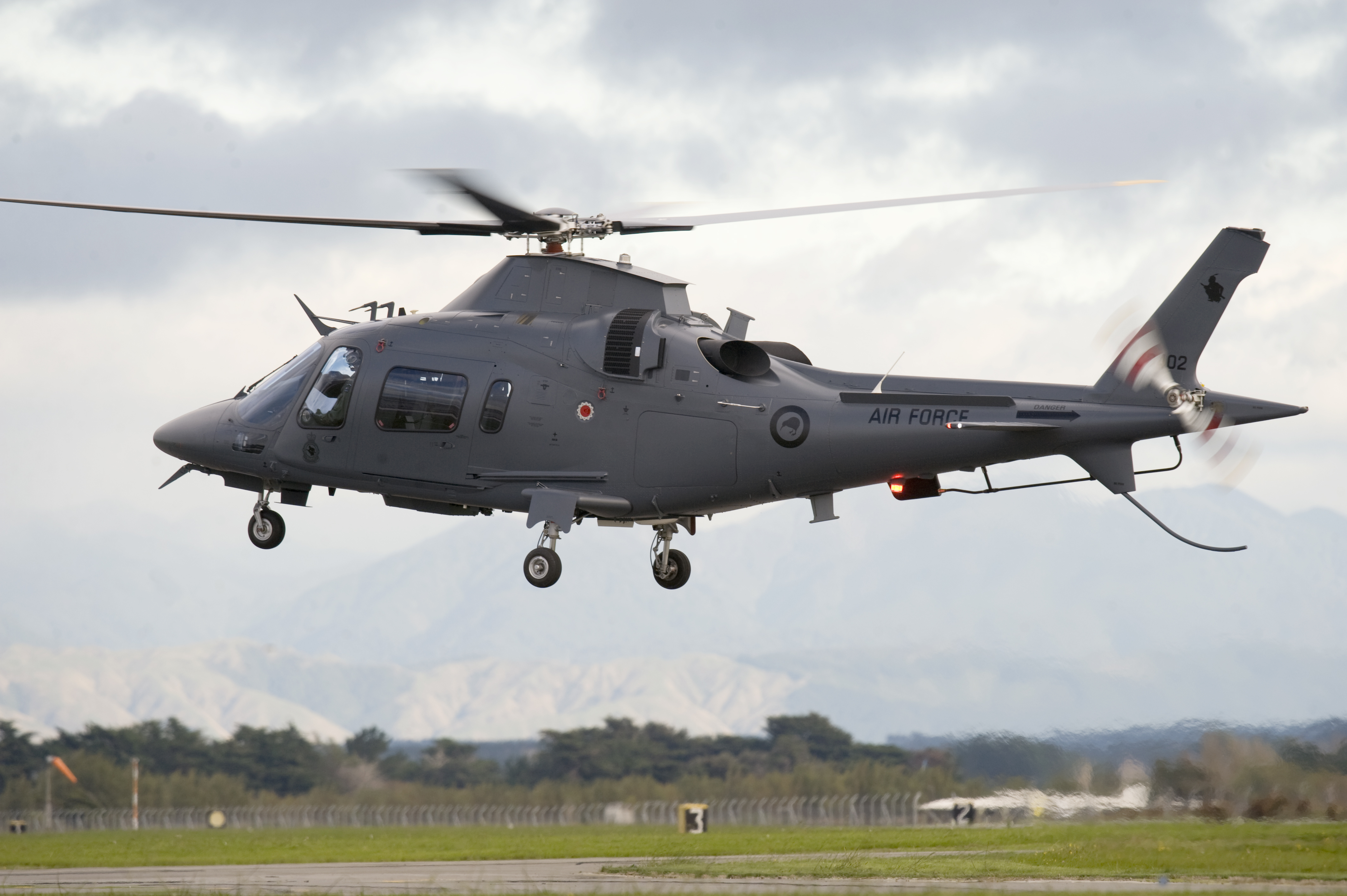
An AW109 lifts off from RNZAF Base Ohakea

No. 14 Squadron RNZAF reformed in 2015 to take up the initial pilot training role with the new T-6C Texan II, resulting in disbandment of the Pilot Training Squadron.

In August 2017 the Republic of Singapore Air Force based its F-16D fighters at Ohakea as a feasibility study for establishment there of a training base for its F-15 fighters. The deployment gave the RSAF opportunity to fly in more open airspace and take advantage of the unique New Zealand flying conditions and mountainous terrain not available in Singapore. However the government cancelled the plan due to cost considerations.

In December 2020, construction commenced on the new hangar, taxiways, and aircraft aprons for the four new P-8 Poseidon aircraft that were due to arrive in 2022. This meant No. 5 Squadron RNZAF consolidated all personnel and new aircraft to Ohakea from RNZAF Base Whenuapai. The first of the new aircraft arrived in December 2022. The final of the four Poseidons was delivered in July 2023.

The Air Force Heritage Flight of New Zealand was established at Ohakea in March 2022. It forms part of the Central Flying School and is a partnership between the RNZAF and civilian organisations.

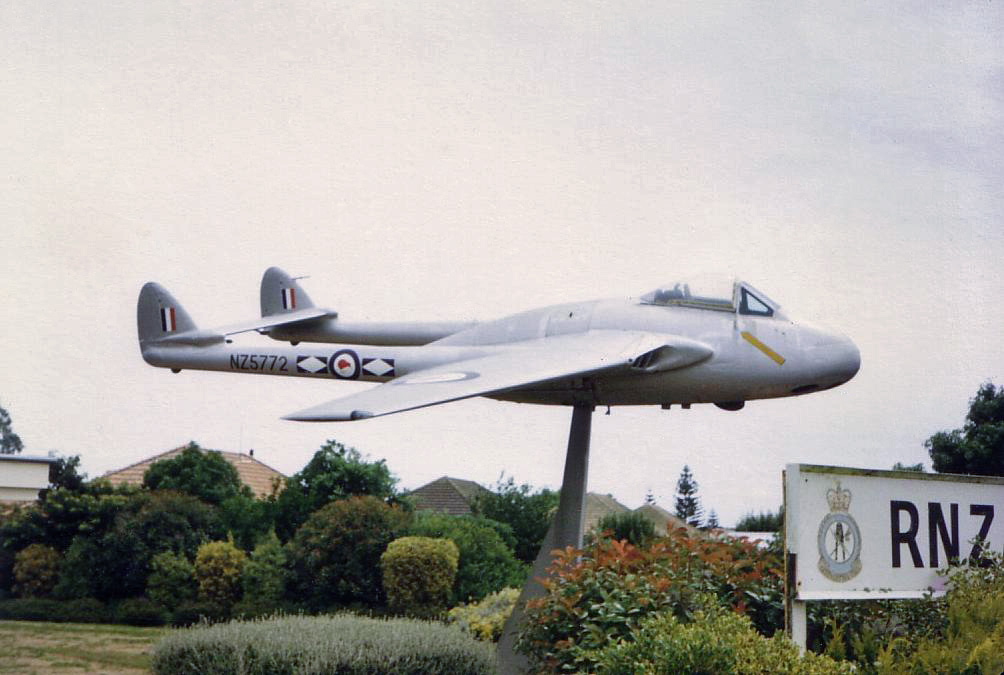
14 Squadron Vampire on permanent gate duty at Ohakea

Personnel Strength: around 1200.

=== Flying Squadrons ===
Squadron	Aircraft	Role
No. 3 Squadron	NH90, AW109 LUH	Search and Rescue, Air assault, Battlefield support, Rotary Wing training.
No.5 Squadron	Boeing P-8 Poseidon	Anti-submarine warfare, maritime patrol, Search and Rescue.
No. 14 Squadron	Beechcraft T-6 Texan II	Basic Pilot Training, Black Falcons Display team
No. 42 Squadron	Beechcraft Super King Air	Twin Engine Pilot Training, VIP transport.
Central Flying School	Beechcraft T-6 Texan II	Pilot Instructor Training

=== Other Units ===
- Flying Training Headquarters
- Base Operations Squadron Ohakea
  - RNZAF Police
  - Security Forces
  - Base Medical Flight
  - Air Refuellers
  - Rescue Fire Service
- Defence Logistics (Air)

== Demographics ==
Ōakea is described by Stats NZ as a rural settlement. It covers 6.06 km^{2} (2.34 sq mi) and had an estimated population of 170 as of June 2025, with a population density of 28 people per km^{2}. It is part of the larger Ohakea-Sanson statistical area.

Historical population
Year	Pop.	±% p.a.
2006	225	—
2013	249	+1.46%
2018	252	+0.24%
2023	162	−8.46%

Ōhakea had a population of 162 in the 2023 New Zealand census, a decrease of 90 people (−35.7%) since the 2018 census, and a decrease of 87 people (−34.9%) since the 2013 census. There were 90 males, 72 females, and 3 people of other genders in 42 dwellings. 5.6% of people identified as LGBTIQ+. The median age was 28.5 years (compared with 38.1 years nationally). There were 27 people (16.7%) aged under 15 years, 69 (42.6%) aged 15 to 29, 63 (38.9%) aged 30 to 64, and 3 (1.9%) aged 65 or older.

People could identify as more than one ethnicity. The results were 88.9% European (Pākehā), 5.6% Māori, 1.9% Pasifika, and 11.1% Asian. English was spoken by 96.3%, and other languages by 9.3%. No language could be spoken by 3.7% (e.g. too young to talk). The percentage of people born overseas was 31.5, compared with 28.8% nationally.

Religious affiliations were 18.5% Christian, 5.6% Islam, and 1.9% Buddhist. People who answered that they had no religion were 74.1%.

Of those at least 15 years old, 51 (37.8%) people had a bachelor's or higher degree, 75 (55.6%) had a post-high school certificate or diploma, and 12 (8.9%) people exclusively held high school qualifications. The median income was $65,100, compared with $41,500 nationally. 24 people (17.8%) earned over $100,000 compared to 12.1% nationally. The employment status of those at least 15 was 117 (86.7%) full-time and 3 (2.2%) part-time.

== Civilian functions ==
Ohakea functions as an alternate airport for heavy civilian aircraft, such as the Boeing 787 and Boeing 777, if they are unable to land at Auckland or Christchurch. This is mainly due to Ohakea's runway 09/27 being the third-longest in New Zealand and the airport's strategic location between the two airports (359 km (223 mi) from Auckland and 435 km (270 mi) from Christchurch). Ohakea has the facilities to process a significant number of passengers since the completion of a new terminal in 2014.

Rangikea primary school opened in 1951 at Ohakea, and closed in 1966. It was replaced by Clifton School which opened in 1967 at the south end of Bulls.

On 29 January 2017, an Emirates Airbus A380 was diverted to RNZAF Base Ohakea due to a Singapore Airlines Airbus A380 blocking the main runway at Auckland International Airport because of a landing gear malfunction. The Emirates A380 was refuelled by RNZAF fuel tankers and departed for Auckland. This was the first time an A380 has landed at Ohakea.

Ohakea has been the subject of a feasibility study into mixed-use military and civilian freight capability, which has included lengthening the main runway to accommodate the Boeing 747.

== Blokart ==
In 2022 the Manawatū Blokart Club based in nearby Sanson hosted the Blokarting 2022 World Championships. The 5 day event saw two days at the Sanson blokart track and three days held on the airfield tarmac at Ohakea.

== Motor racing ==
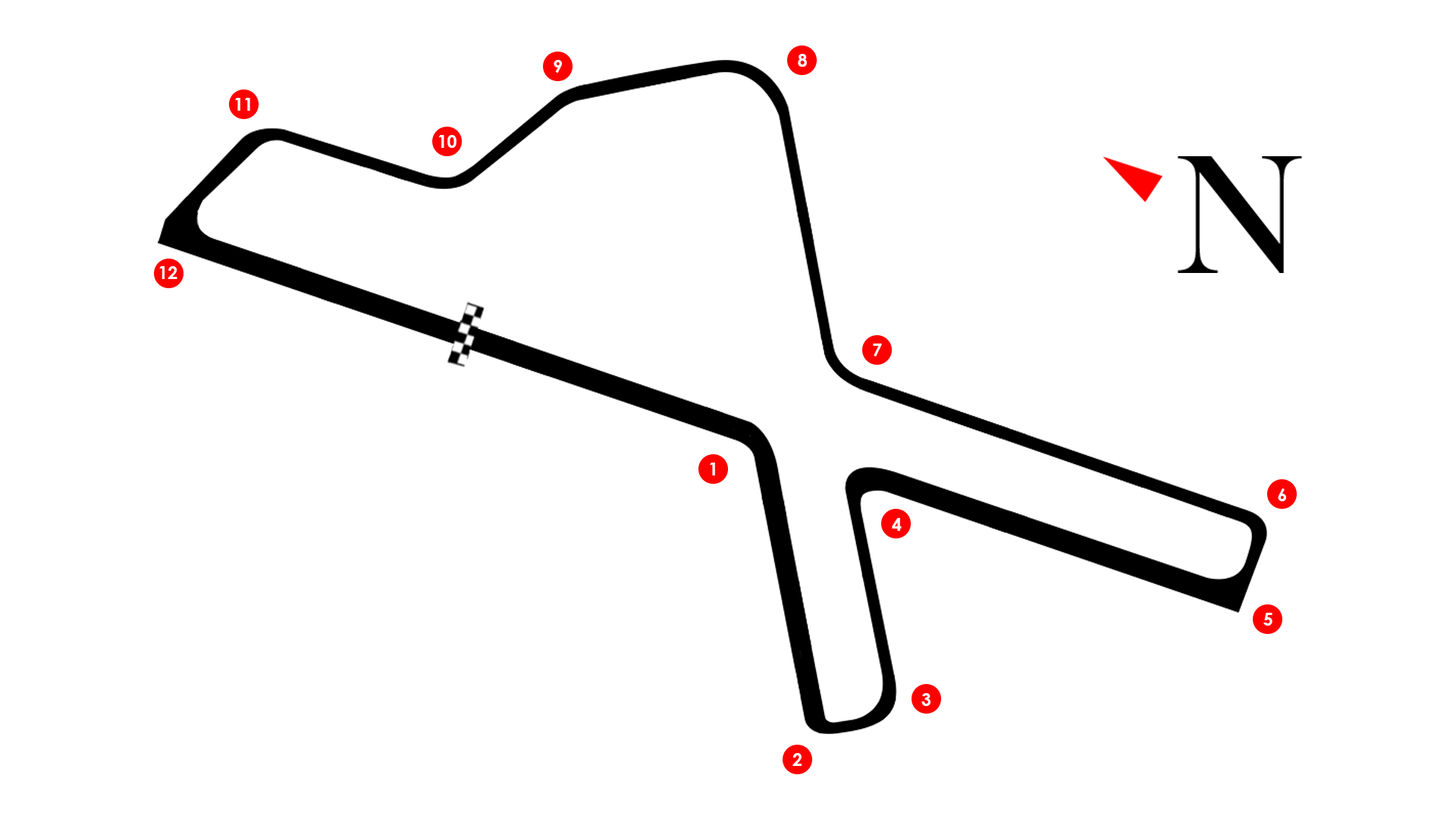
The circuit used for the 1950 New Zealand Grand Prix

The Ohakea Airfield was used as a temporary motor racing circuit, predominantly in the 1950s. A 5.6-kilometre track hosted the inaugural New Zealand Grand Prix in 1950, while a shorter 3.5-kilometre circuit hosted the Ohakea Trophy from 1951 to 1956 and further national meetings from 1959 to 1962. The circuit was reopened for historic events in the 1980s.
