= No. 42 Squadron RNZAF =

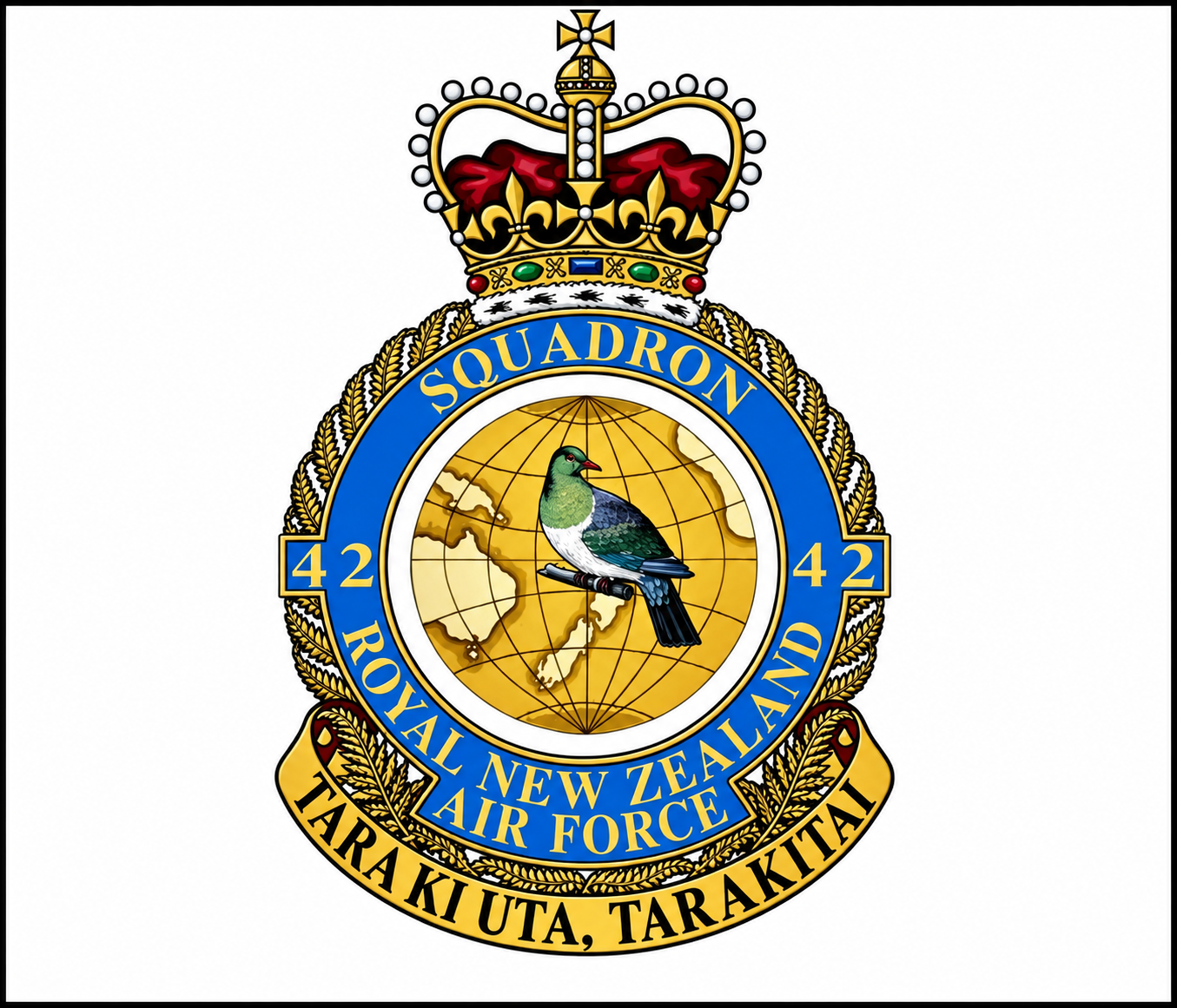
- Active: December 1943 – present
- Country: New Zealand
- Branch: Royal New Zealand Air Force
- Role: VIP transport, aircrew training, general transport
- Part of: CO Flying Training Wing
- Garrison/HQ: RNZAF Base Ohakea
- Mottos: Māori – "Tara Ki Uta, Tara Ki Tai"; English – "We span the land, from coast to coast"
- Colors: Blue and white checkers
- Mascot: Kererū (New Zealand pigeon)
- Equipment: Beechcraft B300 King Air 350i
- Engagements: Gulf War, Iran–Iraq War, Somalia

Commanders
- Current commander: Squadron Leader Craig Clark

Insignia
- Squadron Badge: Kererū perched superimposed on a terrestrial globe on which New Zealand is highlighted.

No. 42 Squadron is an active transport squadron of the Royal New Zealand Air Force (RNZAF). It was formed at Rongotai Airport (Wellington) in December 1943 to provide a communications service around New Zealand, initially using impressed civilian types. It was briefly officially disbanded in 1946, but its aircraft continued with general purpose operations at RNZAF Station Ohakea (near Bulls). When reformed, the squadron was equipped with various numbers of North American Harvard, Auster, Grumman Avenger, Airspeed Oxford, de Havilland Devon, North American P-51 Mustang and Douglas Dakota aircraft.

TBF Avengers flown by 42 Squadron pilots were involved in the first aerial topdressing trials carried out in the world, spreading superphosphate fertiliser alongside the runways at RNZAF Ohakea. Their main purpose was to tow gunnery targets (drogues and banners) for air-to-air gunnery and for the navy and army. The P-51 Mustang also provided high-speed towing of banner targets, especially for de Havilland Vampire jets, and was used extensively for co-operation in army manoeuvres.

== Transformation and VIP role ==
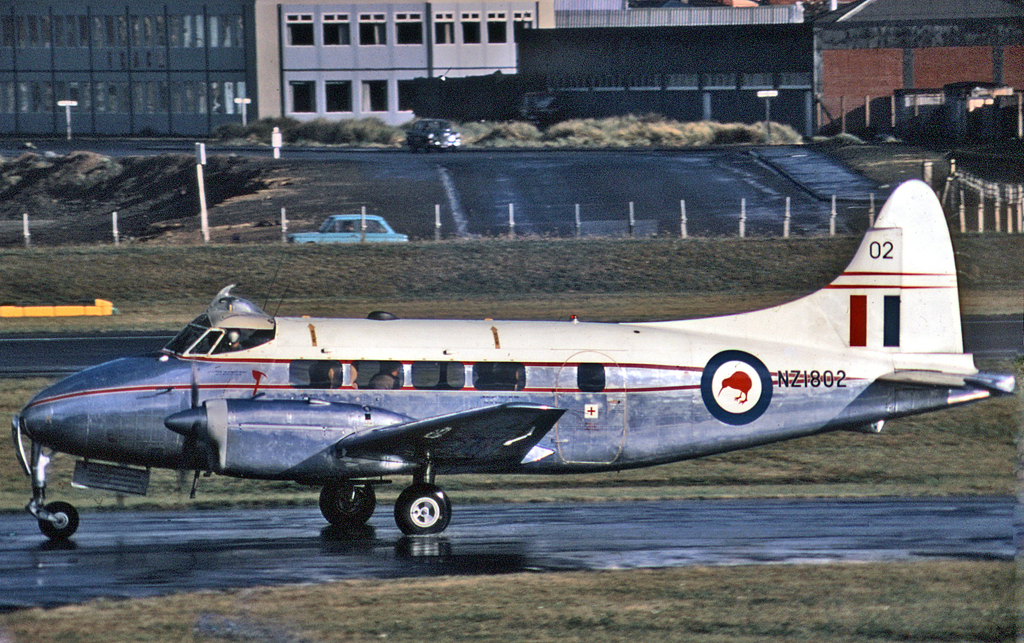
Devon NZ1802 of 42 Squadron at Wellington Airport on 21 April 1971

The role of the squadron gradually changed to VIP flights (Dakota and Devon; the Devons entered service with the RNZAF from 1948), multi-engine conversion courses (Oxford and Devon), and general transport flying around New Zealand and the South Pacific region. During the visit of Queen Elizabeth in 1953/54, 42 Squadron Dakotas carried her around New Zealand. In the late 1950s the squadron's inventory comprised only Dakotas and Devons, and in the mid-1960s the Dakota fleet was enlarged to six aircraft.

The reliable but aging Dakotas were retired in 1977 and replaced by four Hawker Siddeley Andover twin-engine transports. Two were converted to full VIP configuration; one was semi-converted and one remained in the utility configuration.

To accommodate the reformed No. 2 Squadron RNZAF and its Douglas A-4 Skyhawks at Ohakea in 1984, 42 Squadron moved to RNZAF Whenuapai near Auckland and absorbed the Andovers of No. 1 Squadron which was disbanded. The squadron then had ten Andovers.

== Peacekeeping role ==
In 1988 a Hawker Siddeley Andover joined the United Nations Iran–Iraq Military Observer Group (UNIIMOG). The detachment of 17 personnel and aircraft were based at Tehran until withdrawn in December 1990. In 1993 three 42 Squadron Andovers went to Somalia to join the United States-led Unified Task Force (UNTAF). Based at Mogadishu, they flew air transport support missions for the force.

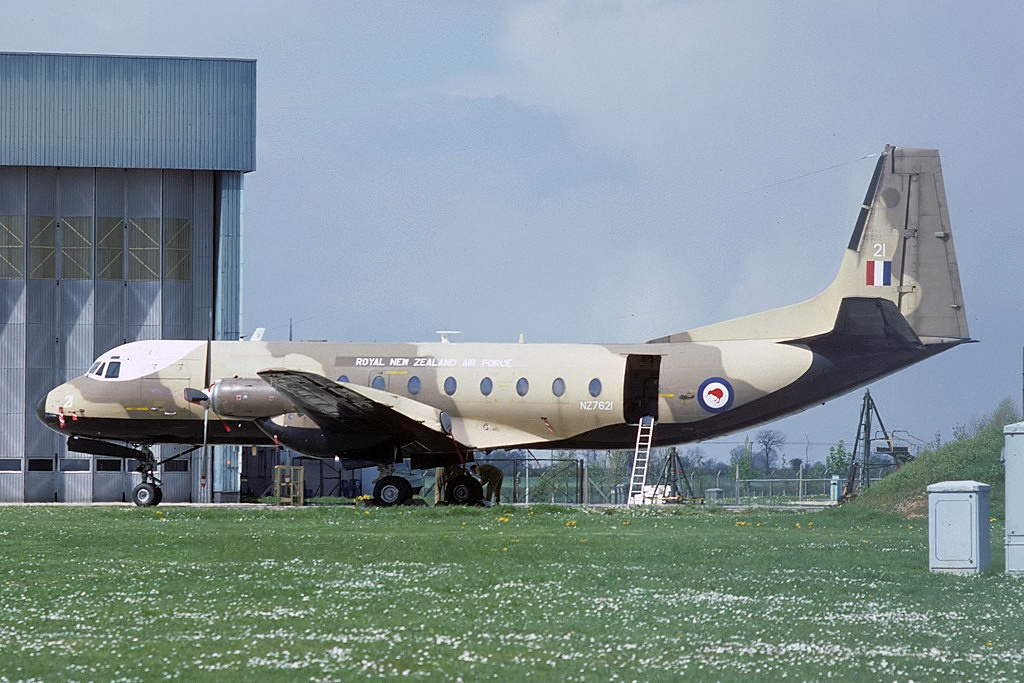
An RNZAF Andover in 1977

== Training Role ==
Four Andovers were withdrawn from service in 1997 and the remainder in 1998. They were replaced by leased Beechcraft Model B200 King Airs. The leasing of aircraft was a new venture for the RNZAF, with a commercial contractor providing maintenance support to the aircraft on site. The workload for the aircraft is multi-engine conversion training of pilots qualified to fly single engine aircraft, continuation training for multi-engine qualified pilots and a limited VIP transport role around New Zealand.

The squadron returned to Ohakea in January 2002. It continued operating four B200 King Airs as part of the flying training wing. In 2018 the RNZAF leased four King Air 350 aircraft to replace the King Air 200 aircraft operated by No.42 Squadron, with the first aircraft arriving at Ohakea in April 2018.

In July 2020, New Zealand Minister of Defence Ron Mark welcomed the delivery of the fourth and final King Air 350 to Ohakea, bringing No.42 Squadron back up to full operating capability. Two of the four aircraft are permanently fitted with sensor suites, allowing for training of aircrew officers as well as multi-engine pilot training. Previously RNZAF aircrew officers were trained in Australia under an agreement with the RAAF.

== Commanding Officers ==
Formed at RNZAF Station Rongotai on the 20th of December 1943

- Wg Cdr J. D. Hewett (Dec 1943-Aug 1945)
- Sqn Ldr K. B. Robinson (Acting)-(Aug 1945-Sep 1945)
- Wg Cdr J. R. S. Agar (Sep 1945-Aug 1946)

Squadron disbanded on the 31st of August 1946 and re-formed at RNZAF Stn Ohakea 15 March 1950 as No. 42 Squadron.

- Sqn Ldr J. R. Wendon (Mar 1950-Mar 1952)
- Sqn Ldr R. D. McVicker, AFC (Mar 1952-Sep 1955)
- Sqn Ldr K. A. Sawyer, DFC (Sep 1955-Nov 1959)
- Sqn Ldr T. J. Danaher (Nov 1959-Dec 1962)
- Sqn Ldr D. R. H. Thomas (Dec 1962-Jul 1964)
- Sqn Ldr J. C. Evison AFC (Jul 1964-Jun 1968)
- Sqn Ldr B. J. Grigg (Jun 1968-Nov 1970)
- Sqn Ldr A. E. Thomson (Nov 1970-May 1972)
- Sqn Ldr F. H. Roach (May 1972-Aug 1974)
- Sqn Ldr G. R. Walsh Acting-(Aug 1974-Sep 1974)
- Sqn Ldr R. T. R. Gilbert, AFC (Sep 1974-Jun 1977)
- Sqn Ldr I. A. Wright (Jun 1977-Dec 1978)
- Sqn Ldr R. L. Randal (Dec 1978-Dec 1980)
- Sqn Ldr D. J. Comber (Dec 1980-Jan 1983)
- Flt Lt R. G. Henderson Acting-(Jan 1983-Mar 1983)
- Sqn Ldr D. M. Hamilton (Mar 1983-Dec 1984)
- Sqn Ldr K. L. Crofskey (Dec 1984-Jun 1985)
- Sqn Ldr A. J. Beattie (Jun 1985-

== See also ==
- 437 (Husky) Transport Squadron and 412 Transport Squadron
- No. 32 (The Royal) Squadron
- No. 34 Squadron RAAF
- No. 38 Squadron RAAF
