= Consolidated PBY Catalina in New Zealand service =

Flying boat and amphibious aircraft use (1943–1954)

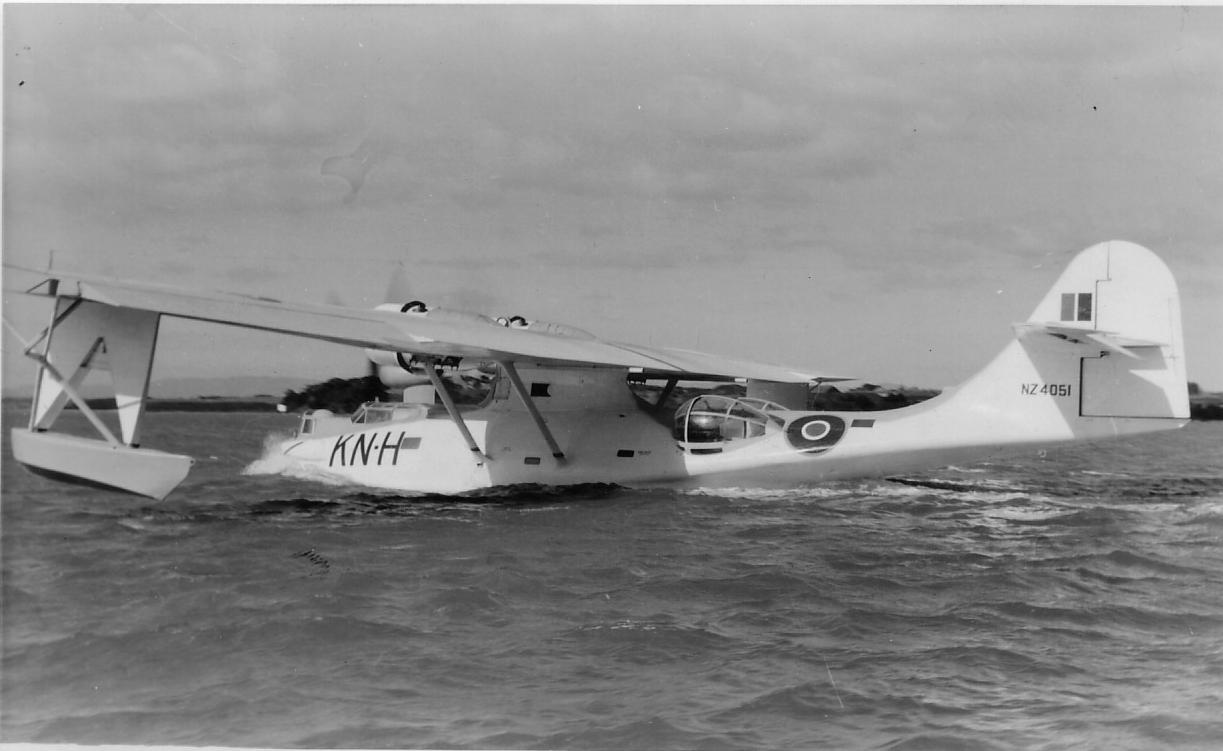
A Consolidated Catalina of the Royal New Zealand Air Force

Developed as a maritime patrol aircraft, the Consolidated PBY Catalina was a flying boat and amphibious aircraft that was widely used during the Second World War. It first entered service with the Royal New Zealand Air Force (RNZAF) in 1943, equipping No. 6 Squadron and used for patrolling and search and rescue missions in the South Pacific. Once the RNZAF received sufficient quantities of the aircraft, a second squadron, No. 5 Squadron was formed in 1944 to operate the type. A total of 56 Catalinas saw service with the RNZAF and the type remained in use during the postwar period until 1954. They were replaced with the Short Sunderland flying boat.

== Background ==
The Consolidated PBY Catalina was a twin-engined flying boat developed by the American company Consolidated Aircraft as a maritime patrol aircraft for use by the United States Navy. It had a wingspan of 31.7 metres (104 ft), a fuselage length of 19.5 metres (64 ft), and a beam of just over 3.0 metres (9.8 ft). Powered by Pratt & Whitney Twin Wasp radial engines, the Catalina carried a crew of nine: a captain, co-pilot, navigator, two wireless operators, a gunner, a flight engineer, flight mechanic and flight rigger, the last three individuals also acting as gunners as required. It was armed with four machine guns, two of which were carried in the forward turret, and one each in starboard and port gunner positions in the rear portion of the fuselage. The aircraft could carry four 650 pounds (290 kg) depth charges or two Mark 13 torpedoes.

The engines of the Catalina were very reliable but the aircraft itself was not particularly fast nor maneuverable and its main fuel tank, mounted in the wing, was vulnerable to enemy gunfire. From mid-1942, radar was fitted as standard equipment for Catalinas, and each also carried short- and long-wave radio gear.

== Acquisition ==
Following the entry of the Empire of Japan into the Second World War in December 1941, and its rapid advance through the Pacific during the first half of the following year, there were major fears that New Zealand would be invaded. The Royal New Zealand Air Force (RNZAF) had relatively few aircraft and these were mostly obsolete. Unable to source new aircraft as the British and Americans prioritised their own needs for the time being, the RNZAF's initial focus was therefore defensive arrangements. Towards the end of 1942, the invasion risk had receded and the RNZAF developed plans to field up to twenty squadrons, many intended for offensive operations.

The United States had overall responsibility in the South Pacific theatre of operations and initially saw New Zealand's role purely as a defensive one. However, Air Vice Marshal Victor Goddard, the Chief of Air Staff in New Zealand and leading the expansion effort of the RNZAF, convinced the United States that New Zealand could play an offensive role in the theatre, if it was given suitable aircraft. For this, the RNZAF was reliant on the United States to update its obsolete inventory as British aircraft output was heavily stretched with its commitments to Europe and North Africa. Eventually, the United States agreed to supply 540 modern aircraft to the RNZAF and integrate the squadrons into the United States command structure in the South Pacific. Of this total, 56 were Consolidated PBY Catalina flying boats. (Note: The RNZAF was to have been delivered 70 Catalinas, but the last group of 14 were cancelled.)

== Operational history ==
=== Second World War ===
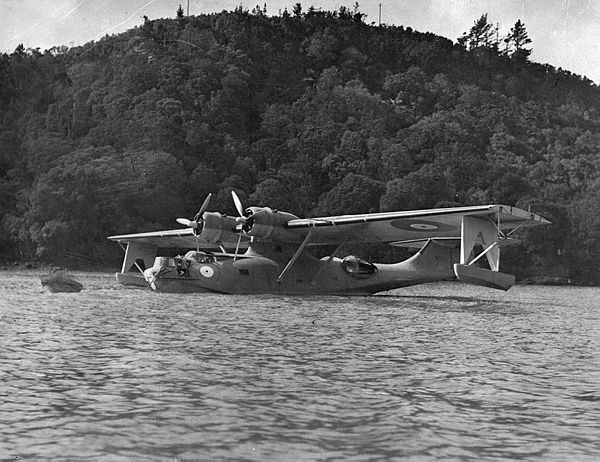
One of the first of the RNZAF's Catalinas at Hobsonville, 1943

The RNZAF's No. 5 Squadron had been based at Suva in Fiji since November 1941, operating antiquated Short Singapore flying boats on anti-submarine patrols. By August 1942, it had been reduced to a flight, operating a pair of Singapores from the newly established RNZAF station at Laucala Bay. Some personnel were sent to the United States Navy facilities at Segond Channel, at Espiritu Santo in the New Hebrides, where they began to familiarise themselves with the Catalinas that equipped the American squadrons there. In November the squadron was officially disbanded, although the flight of Singapores at Laucala Bay remained in operation. Unofficially, the flight at Laucala Bay was known as No. 6 Squadron and this was to form the basis of a new unit equipped with Catalinas.

The RNZAF was to receive its Catalinas in two allocations, the first being of 22 aircraft to be delivered over a six-month period from April. The balance were to be received the following year. The RNZAF had planned for two flying boat squadrons, each having nine operational Catalinas with three in reserve, in line with the complement of a typical Royal Air Force (RAF) flying boat squadron. By the time the last of initial batch of 22 aircraft had been delivered, the plans to raise the second flying boat squadron were put on hold as the remaining Catalinas would not be provided until mid-1944. What had been delivered thus far was only sufficient for the first flying boat squadron, plus a training flight.

Of the first 22 Catalinas delivered to the RNZAF, nine were originally allocated to the RAF and carried appropriate serial numbers and colour schemes. The other thirteen were drawn from a batch intended for service with the United States Navy and carried the serial numbers and scheme of that service. All of these aircraft had been assembled in San Diego, at the manufacturer's facilities there, and designated PBY-5. The first Catalina was flown to Laucala Bay by an American crew on 3 April. In RNZAF service, it was allocated the serial number NZ4001. (Note: The rest of the RNZAF Catalinas continued this numbering, the last receiving the serial number NZ4056.) For delivery of the subsequent aircraft, RNZAF personnel were flown to San Diego, from where they would fly their Catalina to Honolulu, then proceed onto Palmyra Atoll and Canton Island before going onto Laucala. This was a useful exercise as it allowed the new crews to quickly build experience on the type.

The remaining 34 Catalinas delivered were designated PB2B-1, substantially identical to the PBY-5 model but being manufactured in Canada at the Boeing Canada factory. Once built, these were transported to San Diego from where RNZAF crews would collect them for the ferry flight. Most of this group of aircraft were finished in the RAF's standard Coastal Command colours, these being medium sea grey on the upper surfaces with a white gloss finish on the lower; however, at least six of the PB2B-1 Catalinas carried a dark blue finish on their upper surfaces.

==== No. 6 Squadron ====
In May 1943, No. 6 (Flying Boat) Squadron was officially formed; it was led by Wing Commander G. Stead, a New Zealander on loan from the RAF. At the time of its formation, it had seven Catalinas but only two captains qualified to fly them on operations. Several aircrew were not available due to being involved with the delivery flights.

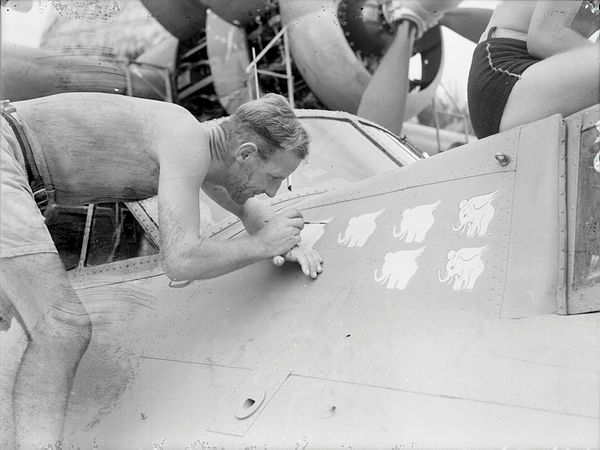
An airman painting a 'Dumbo', indicating a successful search and rescue mission, onto the nose of a Catalina of No. 6 Squadron

No. 6 Squadron officially became operational on 1 August, based on a complement of 12 aircraft in service with three in reserve. The originally planned structure was changed for consistency with that of a United States Navy patrol squadron. The first loss of a RNZAF Catalina was on 5 June, when an aircraft flying to New Zealand crashed into the sea about 50 miles (80 km) from Laucala Bay. Some personal effects were later recovered from a nearby island but there was no trace of the Catalina's crew or the eight passengers it was carrying.

By this time, the threat posed by Japanese surface warships in the South Pacific had largely receded so patrols focused more on submarine detection which were deemed to be the more realistic risk to Fiji. On rare occasions submarines were spotted and attacked but without success. The squadron also carried out search and rescue missions; a flight of this type was known as a Dumbo, after the Walt Disney character. Its first successful Dumbo was completed while it was still training; on 2 May, eight sailors whose vessel had been sunk by a Japanese torpedo were picked up from a liferaft. In October, No. 6 Squadron moved to Espiritu Santo, operating from the Segond Channel. It later operated from Halavao Bay on Florida Island, not far from Guadalcanal.

By the closing stages of the war, the main focus of No. 6 Squadron's operational duties was in search and rescue missions. Its last Dumbo operation was on 9 August 1945, when a Catalina picked up a pilot of the RNZAF whose Vought F4U Corsair fighter had been hit by Japanese anti-aircraft fire as it passed over Kerevat, in the northeast of New Britain. By this time, most of the squadron's surviving complement of PBY-5 Catalinas had been placed in storage at the RNZAF base at Hobsonville in New Zealand, worn out from their service and it was now using the later PB2B-1s.

The squadron's last sortie, flown on 8 September, involved leaflet drops over Nauru and Ocean Islands, advising the Japanese garrisons there of the surrender of the Japanese Empire. The squadron disbanded later that month. However one final Dumbo mission was carried out on 19 September, rescuing a RNZAF pilot whose Corsair had ditched on its ferry flight to Espiritu Santo.

==== No. 5 Squadron ====
The second batch of Catalinas, these being the PB2B-1 type, began to arrive in Fiji from April 1944 and soon there were sufficient numbers to raise a second squadron of flying boats at Laucala Bay. This was No. 5 Squadron and it came into existence in July. Much of its aircrew were RNZAF personnel who had fulfilled instructing duties in New Zealand and had yet to serve in an operational role in the war. The initial focus was training, but the squadron attended to travel flights for RNZAF personnel and any emergencies deemed necessary for the defence of Fiji. By September, the squadron reached its full complement and the surplus aircraft were flown onto Hobsonville in New Zealand and placed in storage to replace worn out aircraft of both the squadrons.

In November, No. 5 Squadron moved to Segond Channel to carry out anti-submarine patrols and escorting shipping. A detachment of one aircraft and crew was based further north at Funafuti, east of the Ellice Islands. This patrolled shipping originating from Hawaii and the continental United States and approaching from the northeast. It also fulfilled search and rescue missions as needed. The aircraft and crew were rotated every two weeks but in January 1945 the detachment was increased to include another five Catalinas, their aircrew, and maintenance personnel. The detachment ended its service at Funafuti in July and returned to Segond Channel.

When the war ended, detachments of the squadron were maintained at Jacquinot Bay in New Britain, Halavo Bay, Segond and Ile Neu, near Nouméa, as search and rescue units while the balance of the aircraft were used as transport, ferrying RNZAF personnel back to Fiji and onto New Zealand. In November, its headquarters was transferred from Segond back to Laucala Bay.

Only one Catalina was lost during the squadron's wartime service; this occurred on 13 April 1945 as an aircraft was taking off from the lagoon at Funafuti. Three of the crew were killed and all the others were injured as was a single passenger, an officer of the United States Navy.

==== Other users ====
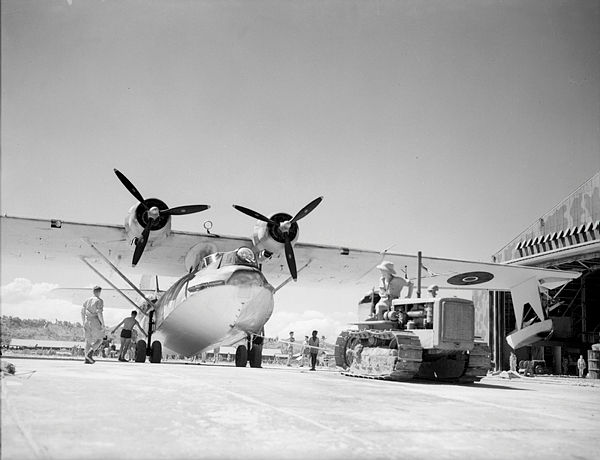
A Catalina at Laucala Bay being towed by a tractor, 1944

In early 1944, a training unit was established at Laucala; this was No. 3 (Flying Boat) Operational Training Unit (OTU) and intended to prepare aircrew for operating Catalinas before they were posted to No. 6 Squadron. Once No. 5 Squadron came into existence, the OTU also prepared the aircrew for that unit as well. The OTU received the first six of the second group of Catalinas to arrive in Fiji. The OTU was disbanded after the war.

=== Postwar period ===
By the end of the war, seven Catalinas had been lost, leaving a total of 48 in service with the RNZAF. Eight PB2B-1s, those deemed to be in the best condition, were retained for No. 5 Squadron, which remained based at Laucala Bay, with another seven in reserve. The Catalinas of No. 5 Squadron continued to fulfill a maritime reconnaissance and search and rescue role. The remaining 33 aircraft that had survived the war were returned to New Zealand and placed in storage at Hobsonville. All the PB2B-1 Catalinas, including those in storage, were updated with new radar equipment. Some Catalinas were briefly loaned to a civilian operator, Tasman Empire Airways Limited; one was used for training of aircrew in 1947 while another was used in 1950 for surveying a route to Tahiti for the airline's flying boats. When they were returned these aircraft were reduced to parts to provide spares for the remainder of the Catalina fleet.

Search and rescue remained a key focus, and the Catalinas were often called upon when canoes and small coastal vessels went missing. The squadron also performed mercy flights; when a hurricane caused widespread damage on several Fijian islands in late 1948, Catalinas carried several tons of food as well as medical supplies and carried back injured people for medical treatment on the main island at Fiji. Some aircraft were lost during this period; three in 1950, with one being a crash of a Catalina flying officials to Western Samoa that killed seven of the eight crew. Another Catalina was lost in October 1952 during a training accident south of Suva; a bad landing saw the hull breached and the aircraft sank with all crew and passengers taking to life rafts and rescued. By the following year, the squadron was only operating two Catalinas.

In July 1952, No. 6 Squadron was reformed at Hobsonville, as part of the Territorial Air Force (TAF), and it was initially equipped with two Catalinas brought out of storage. Its main function was for training of TAF personnel for maritime reconnaissance but it initially also prepared flying crew for the Short Sunderlands that were shortly to come into service.

Anecdotally, by the early 1950s the Catalinas were not suitable for the maritime reconnaissance role they were expected to fulfill, particularly in respect of hunting submarines as the aircraft lacked the necessary equipment for detecting submarines. It was increasingly apparent that the Catalinas were inadequate to carry out New Zealand's defence treaty obligations to surveil the South West Pacific region, as required under the ANZUS Pact signed in 1951. The New Zealand government had purchased 16 Short Sunderland MR5 flying boats as part of its first major postwar purchase of aircraft for the RNZAF. These were to replace the Catalinas of No. 5 Squadron and the arrival of the first two Sunderlands at Laucala Bay on 13 June 1953 began the phasing out of the older aircraft. By this time, only two Catalinas remained in service with the squadron and in October, the last one returned to Hobsonville where it was placed in storage. Back in New Zealand, No. 6 Squadron continued to operate its Catalinas up until April 1954, when the last three aircraft of the type were placed in storage.

== Disposal ==
In 1952, 27 of the Catalinas that were stored at Hobsonville were all broken up for scrap. This included all 15 of the surviving PBY-5s. With Nos. 5 and 6 Squadrons ceasing to use the Catalina, 12 examples were left in storage at Hobsonville. Six of these were sold for scrap in 1954 while the remainder were disposed of two years later. Of these, all but one was sold to a metal smelting yard. The last Catalina was purchased with the intention of converting it to a boat once the wings were removed. Stored at the purchaser's property in Northland, the plan never came to fruition and it was subsequently sold for scrap metal in the 1960s.

== See also ==
- Short Sunderland in New Zealand service
