= RNZAF Base Auckland =

RNZAF Base Auckland

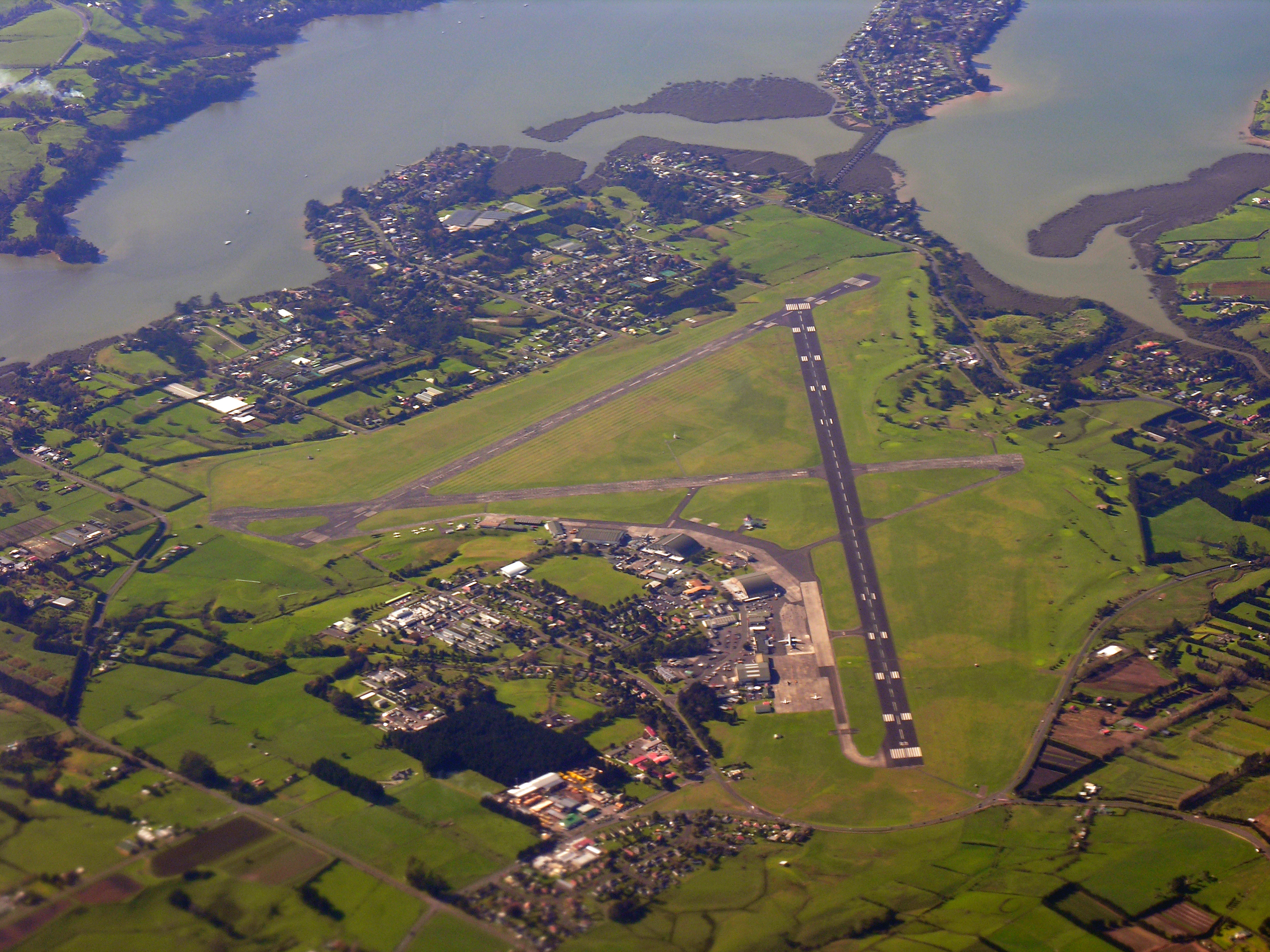
- IATA: MHB; ICAO: NZWP

Summary
- Airport type: Military
- Owner: New Zealand Defence Force
- Operator: Royal New Zealand Air Force
- Location: Whenuapai, New Zealand
- Occupants: No. 6 Squadron RNZAF; No. 40 Squadron RNZAF; No. 62 Squadron RNZAF; No. 230 Squadron RNZAF
- Elevation AMSL: 100 ft (30 m)
- Coordinates: 36°47′16″S 174°37′49″E
- Website: www.airforce.mil.nz

Map
- Interactive map of RNZAF Base Auckland

Runways
Direction	Length		Surface
Direction	ft	m	Surface
03/21	6,665	2,031	Asphalt
08/26	5,187	1,581	Asphalt

RNZAF Base Auckland is a Royal New Zealand Air Force base located near the upper reaches of the Waitematā Harbour in Auckland, New Zealand. The base formerly comprised two separate airfields, Whenuapai and RNZAF Station Hobsonville. Hobsonville was established as a seaplane station in 1928 and was the RNZAF's primary flying boat base in New Zealand until 1967.

== History ==
Construction of Whenuapai as a base for Vickers Wellington bomber aircraft began in 1937, the hangars being built in 1939. Whenuapai was also Auckland's civil international airport from 1945 to 1965 when it was replaced by Auckland Airport. After World War II Auckland became a centre for RNZAF transport and maritime squadrons. RNZAF Station Hobsonville was administratively joined with Whenuapai in 1965 to become RNZAF Base Auckland. Hobsonville subsequently became a grass airfield for No. 3 Squadron RNZAF, which later moved to Ohakea. A New Zealand Army unit comprising various personnel from different regiments as well as the New Zealand Special Air Service were relocated to Papakura Military Camp in 2003.

Whenuapai was expected to close as well, with the Labour Government attempting to centralise the RNZAF at Ohakea. Infrastructure company Infratil and Waitakere City Council studied the feasibility of developing Whenuapai into a commercial airport if the RNZAF moved to Ohakea. In 2009, the National Government overturned the Labour government's decision and decided to retain the air force base at Whenuapai and implemented a reconstruction programme.

A significant reconstruction phase started at RNZAF Base Whenuapai in 2011 and major works were carried out on the main runway, taxiways, and also the relocation of several units from RNZAF Base Hobsonville. Further development ensured that the RNZAF would remain at the present location. A significant government spending programme has been carried out to ensure the present base is brought up to standard.

In 2016 new facilities were under construction to replace those lost with the closure of RNZAF Base Hobsonville or closed due to non-compliance with increased earthquake safety standards introduced following the 2011 Christchurch earthquake. This involves a new gymnasium, accommodation, a 25-metre weapons range, and a medical facility.

Additional funding will also improve areas to the flight line and aprons after a $30 million upgrade on the main runway and taxiways was completed in 2012.

Whenuapai and Hobsonville have both been used as Hollywood movie locations. In 1988 aircraft and base personnel were used for the film The Rescue. In 2004, the first scene for The Chronicles of Narnia: The Lion, the Witch and the Wardrobe was shot at the site (the railway scene). In 2012, Whenuapai was used for the film Emperor.

In January 2023, the based Lockheed P-3 Orions were retired from service, with 5 Squadron RNZAF relocating to RNZAF Base Ohakea with the Boeing P-8 Poseidon; roughly 250 personnel moved to Ohakea as part of the relocation.

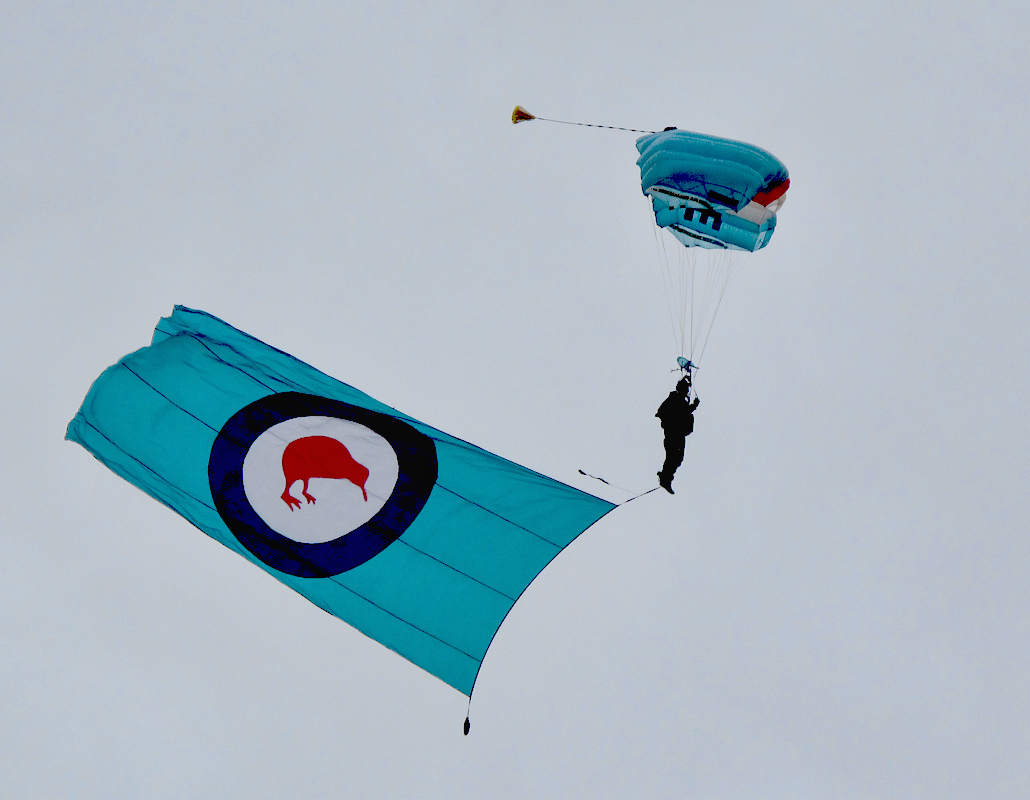
A member of the RNZAF Parachute Training and Support Unit trails the air force flag during the air show at Whenuapai in March 2009.

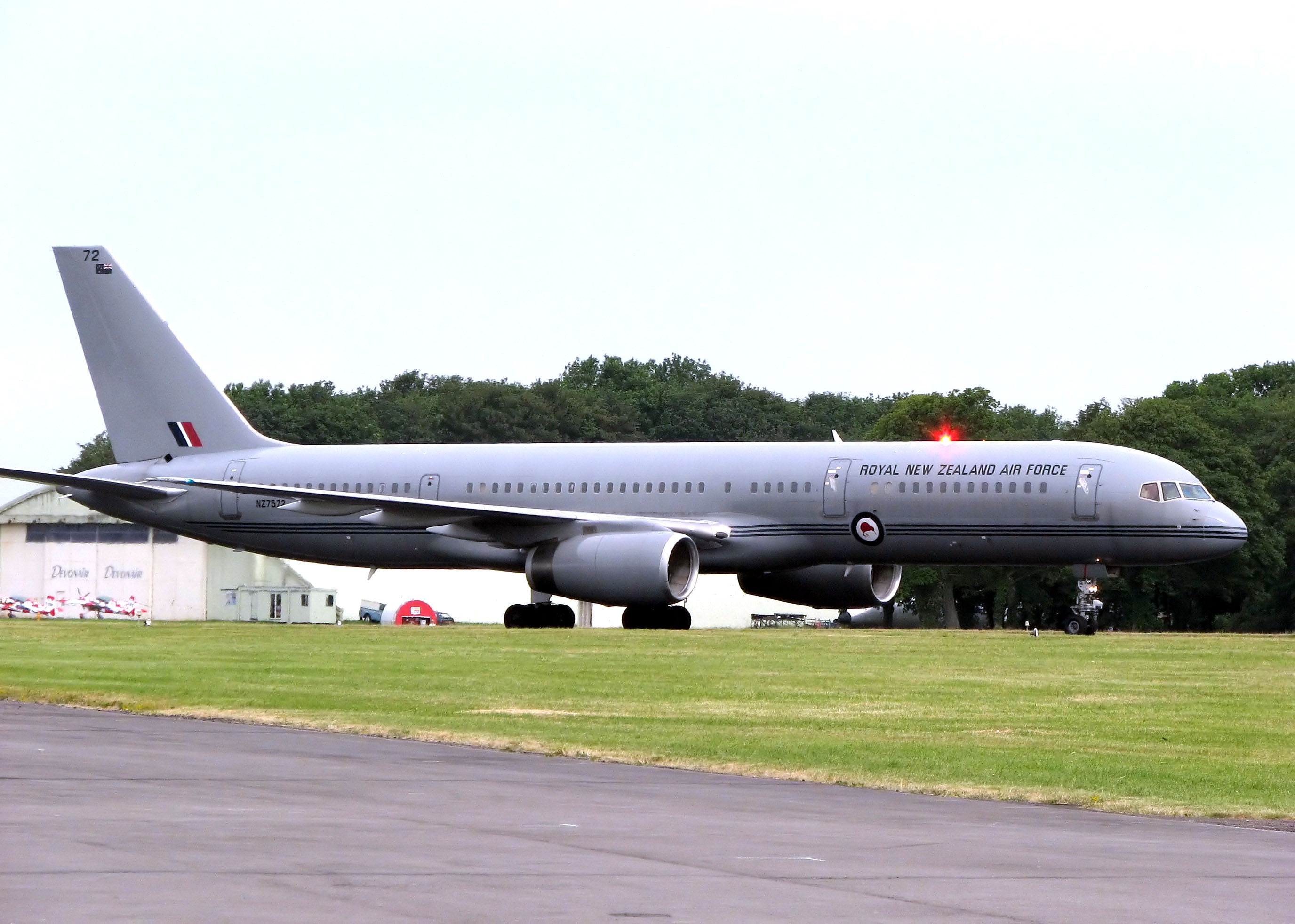
A No. 40 Squadron Boeing 757–200 in 2006

The personnel strength is around 1500.

== Flying Squadrons ==
Squadron	Aircraft	Role
No. 6 Squadron	Kaman SH-2G Super Seasprite	Naval Aviation
No. 40 Squadron	C-130J Super Hercules, Boeing 757	Tactical and Strategic transport.

== Other units ==
- Base Headquarters
- No. 62 Squadron RNZAF (Space Operations)
- No. 230 Squadron RNZAF (Mission Support)
- Base Operations Squadron Auckland
  - RNZAF Police
  - Rescue Fire Service
  - Base Medical Flight
- Parachute Training Support Unit
- Security Forces Military Working Dog Training School
- Aviation Medicine Unit
- Survival Training Centre

== NZ Government Secure Data Centre ==
In 2023 the government announced Whenuapai as the site of secure data centre for use by GCSB and SIS

== See also ==
- 1943 Liberator crash at Whenuapai
