= Short Sunderland in New Zealand service =

WW2 maritime reconnaissance flying boat

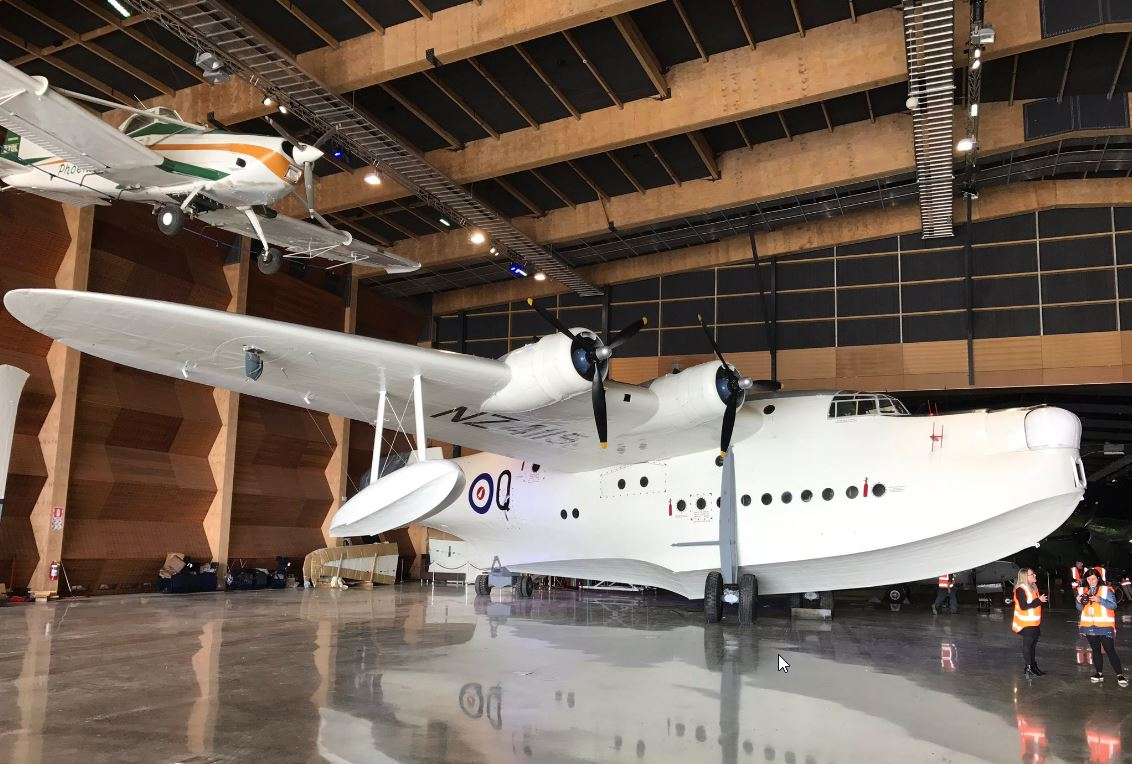
A Short Sunderland MR5 of the Royal New Zealand Air Force, displayed at the Museum of Transport and Technology in Auckland

The Short Sunderland was developed as a long range maritime reconnaissance flying boat and was widely used during the Second World War. New Zealand purchased four Sunderlands in early 1944 for use as transport aircraft but did not receive them until the end of that year.

They were operated by the Flying Boat Transport Flight of the Royal New Zealand Air Force (RNZAF) from February 1945, carrying cargo and repatriated New Zealand military personnel from the South Pacific back to New Zealand. They soon began carrying paying passengers and in late 1947 the Sunderlands were transferred to the New Zealand National Airways Corporation. After being used on passenger routes between Auckland and Fiji for a few years, they were eventually returned to the RNZAF.

The RNZAF acquired 16 more Sunderlands in 1953 and these equipped Nos. 5 and 6 Squadrons, operating from Fiji and New Zealand respectively, to carry out maritime reconnaissance and anti-submarine patrols. The Fiji-based aircraft were also used for search and rescue missions. Some Sunderlands were also used by the RNZAF's Maritime Operational Conversion Unit, based at RNZAF Station Hobsonville. Considered to be obsolete by 1960, they began to be withdrawn from service a few years later. The last operational flight for a Sunderland of the RNZAF was in April 1967. The majority were scrapped, although two still survive, one as an exhibit at the Museum of Transport and Technology in Auckland, and the other in the collection of the aviation enthusiast Kermit Weeks.

== Background ==
The Short Sunderland, officially the Short S.25 Sunderland, was designed by Short Brothers as a development of the civilian Short Empire flying boat that was used by Imperial Airways in the 1930s. The Sunderland, of which around 750 were built from 1937 to 1945, first entered service with the Royal Air Force (RAF) in June 1938 and went on to serve in the Far East, Mediterranean, and Africa, the Pacific as well as in Europe.

Intended as a long range maritime reconnaissance-bomber, in its standard configuration the Sunderland was powered by four 1,200 horsepower Pratt & Whitney engines and had a crew of ten. Its top speed was 343 kilometres per hour (213 mph) but it cruised at 214 kilometres per hour (133 mph). With a bomb load of just over 750 kilograms (1,650 lb), it had a range of about 4,329 kilometres (2,690 mi). Its wingspan was 34.4 metres (113 ft) while the hull was 26 metres (85 ft) long and 10.5 metres (34 ft) deep. The aircraft was heavily armed, with twelve machine guns in total. Two of these were in a forward powered turret while four were in the tail turret. A machine gun was provided to the port and starboard sides at the beam and four were fixed firing forward. It also carried up to 2,250 kilograms (4,960 lb) in bombs and/or depth charges. On account of its defensive armament, the Sunderland became known as the 'Flying Porcupine' to the Germans.

== Sunderland Mk III ==
At the start of 1944, the Empire of Japan was no longer the dominant force in the South Pacific that it had been and the British government was beginning to consider the postwar outlook for the region. The United States already had airfields on several islands in the area that could be used as the basis for commercial flight operations by civilian aircraft but the British lacked an equivalent land presence to achieve this. This led the British to favor flying boats as the basis for commercial operations since less land infrastructure, particularly runways, would be required.

On 27 January, the British government offered New Zealand the opportunity to purchase four Short Sunderland Mk III transport flying boats, to be operated by the Royal New Zealand Air Force (RNZAF). The asking price was £60,000 each, which was considered to be very reasonable. The New Zealand government agreed, also buying £80,000 of equipment to support the Sunderlands, which was envisaged to form the basis of a transport service in the South Pacific. The purchase met some resistance; it had to be approved by the Combined Munitions Assignment Board. The American representatives on the board, concerned about how the aircraft could be the basis for commercial operations in the South Pacific after the war, initially declined to approve the purchase but then indicated they would allow it to proceed if the commander-in-chief South Pacific Area Vice-Admiral J. H. Newton, decided the aircraft was needed in his theatre of operations. The Chief of Air Staff in New Zealand, Air Vice-Marshal Leonard Isitt, obtained approval from Newton for the purchase on the justification that they were needed for military use. However, there was still ongoing sensitivity around the purchase, and Isitt asked that there be little publicity of the purchase so as to avoid an impact on the allocation of American aircraft to the RNZAF.

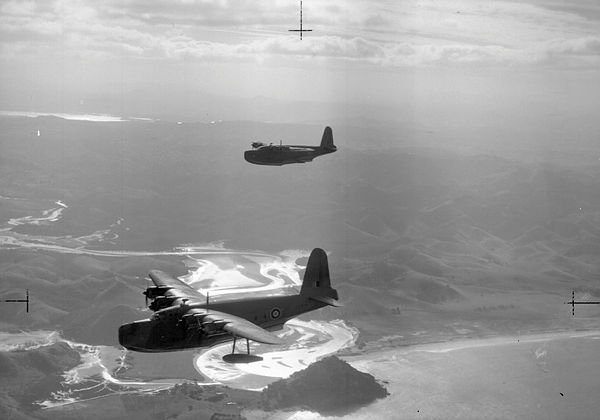
Two of the four RNZAF Sunderland Mk IIIs on the final leg of their delivery flight to New Zealand; shortly after this photograph was taken, there was a collision between the Lockheed Lodestar carrying the photographer and one of the Sunderlands

The newly purchased Sunderland Mk III transports, of which there were already 24 in RAF service, were a modification of the standard aircraft. Each Sunderland had a crew of seven and was able to carry between 24 and 30 passengers plus freight. Its load capacity was just under 10,000 kilograms (22,000 lb) and when fully loaded weighed 25,000 kilograms (55,000 lb). It was powered by four Bristol Pegasus XVIII engines and capable of flying up to 340 kilometres (210 mi) per hour and had a range of 2,860 kilometres (1,780 mi). Four standard Sunderlands was converted to transports at Short's premises in Rochester, a process which began in June.

=== Entry to service ===
Upon completion, the Sunderlands were ferried to New Zealand by RNZAF personnel, formerly of No. 490 Squadron, who happened to be present in the United Kingdom undergoing training on the aircraft. They were flown to West Africa, across to South America, onto North America and then through the Pacific. The ferry flights were the longest undertaken by the RNZAF during the war, as normally they would be via the Middle East, across the Indian subcontinent and onto Australia. Departing England on 21 October, the first two Sunderlands arrived at the RNZAF base at Laucala Bay in Fiji in late November. The other two arrived shortly afterwards. All of the Sunderland aircraft were quickly cleaned up and fitted with cabin chairs; it had been decided that they would operate a passenger service between Fiji and New Zealand. They then proceeded as a group to Auckland on 2 December, transporting 80 personnel from Fiji.

It had been intended that the Sunderlands would arrive in Auckland in formation as a publicity event for the RNZAF. Their arrival was marred when one collided with a Lockheed Lodestar carrying a photographer. Fortunately both aircraft were able make a safe landing, although the Sunderland did so well short of its intended destination. It was towed by a fishing boat to Whangārei and after repairs were carried out, and flew to Auckland the next day.

=== Flying Boat Transport Flight ===
Sunderland Mk III aircraft codes
RAF Serial No.	RNZAF Serial No.	Name
ML792	NZ4101	Tainui
ML793	NZ4102	Tokomaru
ML794	NZ4103	Matātua
ML795	NZ4104	Takitimu

The four Sunderlands formed the Flying Boat Transport Flight, operating from Hobsonville Air Force base. From 1 January 1945, it was commanded by Squadron Leader Richard Makgill. Prior to entering service, they were painted with RNZAF markings and given new serial numbers. They also received names in Māori, the indigenous language of New Zealand; the namesakes were four of the legendary Māori canoes that carried the original migrants from Hawaiki to New Zealand. The interiors were reworked for carriage of passengers and freight and engineering staff of the RNZAF received training from experienced Royal Australian Air Force personnel.

In February the Flying Boat Transport Flight began operating regular return services from Mechanics Bay, in Auckland, and Espiritu Santo with a stop at Nouméa, and Suva, in Fiji, respectively. Special one-off flights were also to be undertaken as required. Flight times were typically between 7½ and 8½ hours, although adverse winds could add up to an extra 60 minutes to the flight. Their inbound cargo was repatriated RNZAF personnel from the forward areas as the war effort in the South Pacific wound down. They would also carry mail and unofficial supplies of sugar and cigarettes, valuable commodities in New Zealand due to rationing. Paying civilian passengers were carried on outbound flights to Suva, each paying £30 for the fare. By September, the flights to and from Espiritu Santo ceased, and the aircraft switched to the Auckland-Suva route and by the end of the year, a total of 8,300 personnel had been repatriated by the Sunderlands and the Lockheed Hudsons, Lodestars and Douglas Dakotas also carrying out repatriation flights. After a number of engine failures, all of the Sunderlands were laid up for a number of months from October for their propellers to be replaced. During this time, the paintwork on each Sunderland was stripped, leaving the aircraft in a natural metal finish.

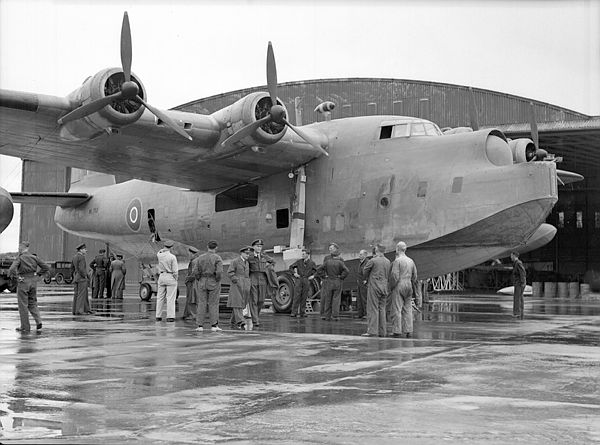
A Sunderland Mk III parked up at Hobsonville, December 1944

One Sunderland, NZ4103, was converted for civilian operations in January 1946 and soon afterwards, two of the others were used for training of Tasman Empire Airways Limited (TEAL) flight crew, preparing them for the airline's newly acquired Short Sandringham flying boats. International service resumed in June, with the Sunderlands of the Flying Boat Transport Flight making a weekly flight to Suva on a Friday, and returning the next day. Outbound passengers were typically civilian with military personnel taking seats on the inbound flights back to Auckland. However, by the end of the year, the majority of passengers in either direction were paying civilians.

=== Civilian usage ===
The postwar reorganisation of the RNZAF was conducted with a degree of uncertainty as to New Zealand's future defence policy. However, it was soon decided to hand over the Sunderlands to a civilian operator and in October 1946, NZ4103, now converted to an airliner, began flying to Chatham Island. Following a directive from the New Zealand government in May 1947, two more Sunderlands, NZ4102 and NZ4104 were converted to passenger operation and were handed over to the New Zealand National Airways Corporation (NAC). The last Sunderland, NZ4101, was transferred to NAC later in the year. It was subsequently scavenged for spares.

The NAC Sunderlands continued to fly to Suva and back from Auckland until March 1949, at which time TEAL took responsibility for the route with its own aircraft. The surviving NAC Sunderlands were returned to the RNZAF and parked up at Hobsonville for disposal in May 1951 although the tenders were not taken up. NZ4104 briefly returned to service with the RNZAF the following year, being used for training aircrew in taxiing and beaching until 1953. It was reduced to scrap in 1955.

== Sunderland MR5 ==
In 1951, the New Zealand government purchased 16 Short Sunderland MR5 (Note: It was also known as the Sunderland MR Mk V.) flying boats as part of its first major postwar purchase of aircraft for the RNZAF. British-sourced aircraft, rather than American, was preferred as New Zealand's defense policy was tied into that of the United Kingdom and compatibility with the RAF was easier to achieve if both air forces operated the same types of aircraft. As part of its defense commitments under the Anglo-New Zealand-Australia-Malaya (ANZAM) defense plan, New Zealand was responsible for surveillance of the South Pacific. The Sunderlands were seen as suitable for this task, not only for their cost effectiveness and ability to easily access remote Pacific islands lacking suitable airfields, but also for the work involved: reconnaissance, escort and anti-submarine operations.

The Sunderland MR5s were of similar dimensions to the Mk III, but had superior engines and were fitted with feathering propellers. Upgraded radar, radio and navigation equipment was fitted but its defensive armament was reduced, with the mid-upper turret being removed. In addition to the pilot and co-pilot, each Sunderland carried two navigators, three signalers, and two flight engineers, for a total of nine crew. The upper surfaces of each aircraft were painted medium-sea-gray while their flanks and undersides were a gloss white. They carried RAF markings, but the red center of the roundels were soon painted out and replaced with a white fern. They were assigned sequential serial numbers, beginning with NZ4105. In contrast to the earlier Sunderlands that served with the RNZAF, the aircraft were not given names.

The aircraft were sourced from the RAF's reserve stocks and cost £7,000 each, with refurbishment expenses of £30,000. This was considered quite economic, particularly given that the comparable American equivalent, the Martin PBM Mariner, cost $1,000,000 per aircraft. Beginning in late 1952, the necessary refurbishment of the Sunderlands was carried out in Northern Ireland, at the Short Bros facilities in Belfast. It soon began to be apparent that costs would exceed what was budgeted and some thought was given to reducing the order to 12 examples; however, the Chief of Air Staff RNZAF, Air Vice-Marshal D. V. Carnagie, maintained that the original number of 16 aircraft was necessary, and consequently, additional funding was sourced.

=== Delivery ===
Personnel from No. 6 Squadron was sent to the United Kingdom in early 1953 to ferry the Sunderlands to New Zealand, where they commenced a conversion course on the type. The first of the Sunderlands was formally handed over to the RNZAF on 18 May and it and a second example departed ten days later from RAF Calshot, where the crews underwent familiarisation with their aircraft. It flew a route across the Middle East, the Indian subcontinent, Southeast Asia, Australia, Nouméa, using the RAF's flying boat services at each stop, and onto Fiji. However, significant work on the Sunderlands, for example overhauls, was undertaken by TEAL engineering staff at their facilities at Mechanics Bay in Auckland. The RNZAF lacked technical staff while TEAL's engineering staff were underused following a significant reduction in the airline's flying boat service.

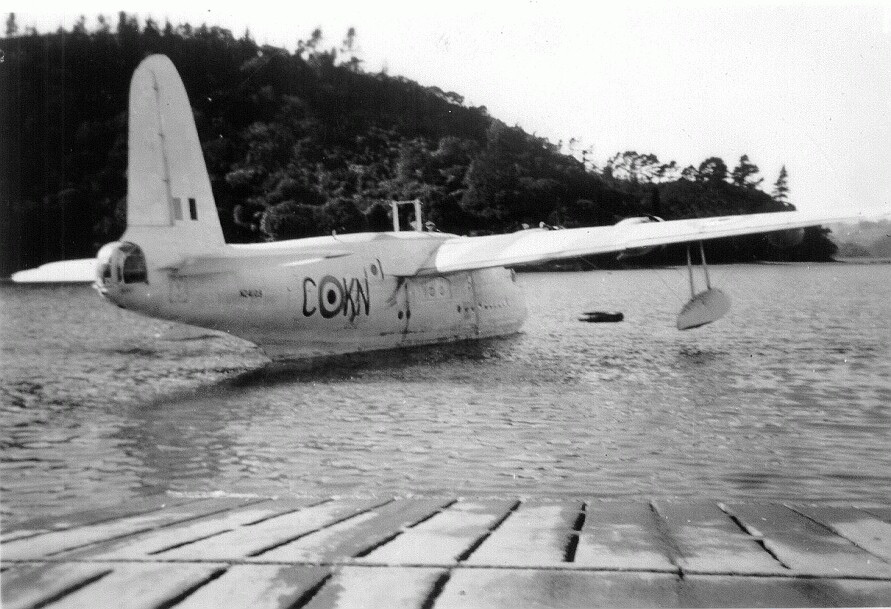
A RNZAF Sunderland MR5 at Hobsonville, July 1955

=== Operational history ===
Some of the Sunderland MR5s were to equip No. 5 Squadron, which was based at the RNZAF's station at Laucala Bay and operated in a maritime surveillance role. The arrival of the first two Sunderlands at Laucala Bay on 13 June 1953 began the phasing out of the Consolidated PBY Catalina flying boats that previously equipped the squadron.

While flying its Sunderlands, No. 5 Squadron monitored foreign fishing fleets, watched out for submarines, gathered intelligence, and also performed search and rescue missions in the South Pacific. Often their patrols would last for 10 to 12 hours, and even 14 hours on occasion. Russian submarines making their way south to Antarctica were a particular concern and sonar buoys would be dropped to detect them; Russian support vessels would also be tracked so that any submarines linking up with them for supplies could be spotted. The Sunderlands were regularly flown to Singapore for involvement in military exercises and several were involved in Operation Grapple, the British Atomic Test programme carried out on Christmas Island in June 1957. As there was concern regarding the level of fallout from the testing, the Sunderlands, operating from Papeete, collected radiation samples from sites in French Polynesia and transported monitoring equipment to Funafuti, in Tuvalu.

No. 5 Squadron's area of responsibility when carrying out search and rescue missions was significant: about 13 million square kilometres (5 million square miles), from just north of Tarawa to Norfolk Island in the south, and from New Caledonia extending eastwards past Tahiti. Significant searches included that for MV Joyita in 1955, in which the vessel was found but with no trace of its crew, and the MV Vasu in 1956. During the latter, a Sunderland spotted survivors from the foundered ship in the water, dropped liftboats to them and coordinated their pickup by a nearby vessel. In October 1962, a Sunderland landed on the remote atoll of the Minerva Reefs to rescue the crew of a Tongan vessel, the Tuaikaepau, which had been shipwrecked there since July. One Sunderland was lost while on operations with No. 5 Squadron; it was damaged at Tarawa when making a landing in rough seas. Although repaired for the flight back to Laucala Bay, it was found to not be airworthy and was scrapped.

In New Zealand, No. 6 Squadron, a unit of the Territorial Air Force (TAF) based at Hobsonville, also received some of the Sunderland MR5s. As part of their duties, they would often fly the aircraft to Laucala Bay, spending a weekend there on operational training before returning to New Zealand. However, when the TAF was disbanded in 1957, the squadron ceased to exist. The remainder of the Sunderland MR5s went to the Maritime Operational Conversion Unit (MOCU) which, like No. 6 Squadron, was based at Hobsonville. The MOCU prepared flight crew for the operation of the Sunderland in an intensive 14-week long course.

From 1958, the RNZAF operated a passenger service using Sunderlands between Evans Bay in Wellington and Chatham Island, where they landed on Te Whanga Lagoon. Although the passenger and cargo logistics were handled by a civilian operator, the flight crew were all RZNAF personnel from MOCU. The regular service ended when a Sunderland crashed on an unmarked rock when as it was taxiing on the lagoon prior to taking off from the Chathams in late 1959. The occasional flight was still made as the need arose, often as a consequence of a medical emergency on the Chathams.

=== Replacement ===
By 1960, it was apparent that the Sunderlands were obsolete and unable to detect modern submarines in training exercises. The following year, the New Zealand government proposed to begin scaling back the number of Sunderlands in service. This coincided with an effort to modernise the RNZAF. As most of the Pacific Islands now had good airstrips, there was less need to rely on flying boats and more conventional aircraft could be used to fulfill the maritime reconnaissance role.

In March 1964, a number of Lockheed P-3 Orions were purchased and these began entering service with No. 5 Squadron in September 1966. As they had a superior range to the Sunderlands, the RNZAF's base at Laucala Bay was closed and No. 5 Squadron shifted to the RNZAF base at Whenuapai. The Laucala Bay site became the home of the University of the South Pacific. A detachment of two Sunderlands remained in Fiji for a time to carry out search and rescue missions as needed and continue maritime surveillance.

=== Disposal ===
Several Sunderlands in storage at Hobsonville had been scrapped in October 1962 and salvaged for spares for the remainder of the fleet. One Sunderland was sold in December 1963; this had been placed in storage four years previously. It was used to replace a damaged Short Sandringham of the aviation company Airlines of New South Wales. It was subsequently sold to an airline in the Caribbean and flew routes in the region for a number of years. In 1979 it was sold again, this time to a British company run by Edward Hulton which flew charter flights in the United Kingdom. It is now owned by Kermit Weeks, who acquired it in 1993. Three more Sunderlands were sold for scrap during 1964 and 1965. In December 1966, one Sunderland was donated to the Museum of Transport and Technology in Auckland. In February 1967, five Sunderlands were put up for tender.

The last Sunderland on detachment in Fiji was flown back to Hobsonville on 2 April 1967, marking the final operational flight for the type in New Zealand service. It, along with the final Sunderland still in service, was the subject of a successful tender two months later from an Australian firm and broken up after the engines had been removed. The same firm had already given similar treatment to three of the Sunderlands that had been tendered earlier in the year.

== See also ==
- Consolidated PBY Catalina in New Zealand service
