= Waterfall Bay =

Waterfall Bay may refer to:

- Waterfall Bay, Hong Kong
- Waterfall Bay, Papua New Guinea
