= Jacquinot Bay =

Bay in Papua New Guinea

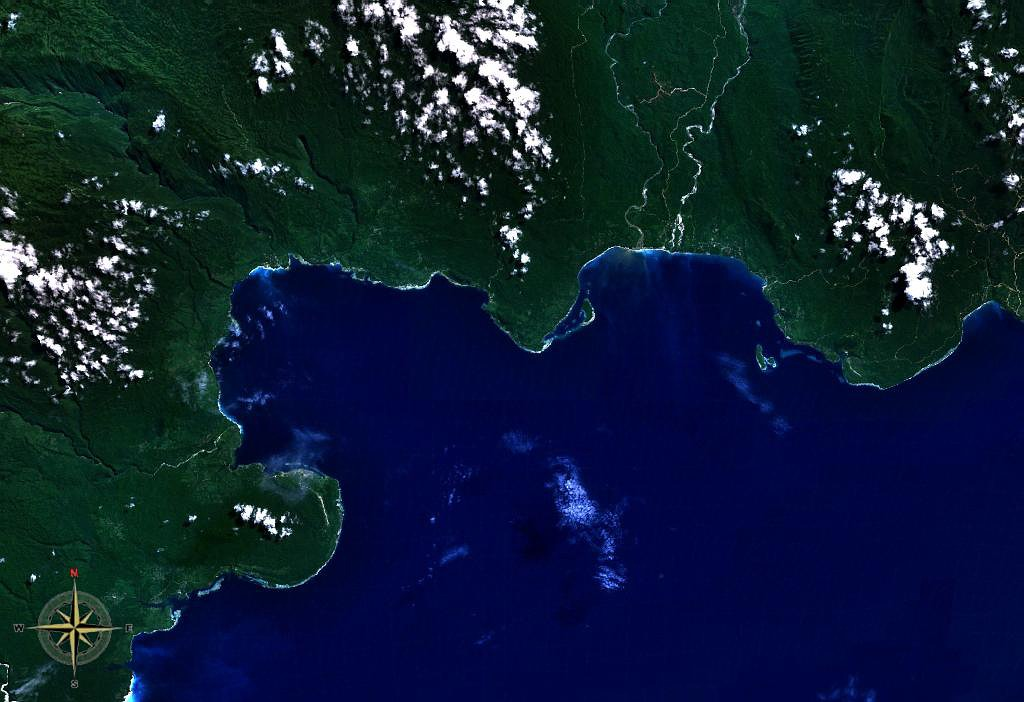
Jacquinot Bay (west) and Waterfall Bay seen from space

Jacquinot Bay (English: /ʒækɪˈnoʊ/ zhak-ih-NOH, French: [ʒakino]) is a bay in East New Britain Province, south-eastern New Britain, Papua New Guinea, at 5.5666667°S 151.5°E. It is near the mountain where twenty-eight people died when a Royal Australian Air Force plane crashed in November 1945. To its west is the Gasmata Bay and the Wide Bay and Rabaul Bay are situated to the north-east.

Before the Second World War, a palm tree plantation was started here, known as Palmalmal Plantation (Pal Mal Mal). The area also had a Catholic Mission, headed by Father Edward Charles "Ted" Harris.

Waterfall Bay lies to the east.

== Wartime history ==
In April 1942, 156 Australian soldiers and civilians gathered at Pal Mal Mal after fleeing Rabaul. They were rescued by MV Laurabada, which then transported them to Port Moresby. Later, the port was taken over by the Japanese, and remained in their hands until the area was liberated on 4 November 1944. The Australian Army constructed Jacquinot Bay Airfield in 1944–1945, following an amphibious landing at Jacquinot Bay.

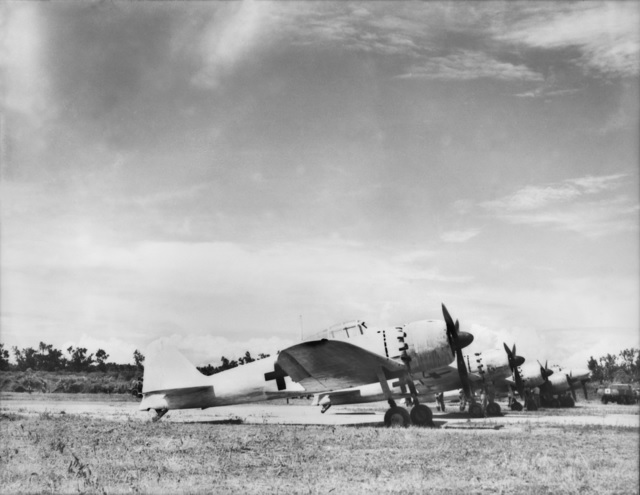
Surrendered planes in Jacquinot Bay
