= No. 62 Squadron RNZAF =

- Roundel of the Royal New Zealand Air Force
- Active: August 1943 – October 1944; July 2025 – present
- Country: New Zealand
- Branch: Royal New Zealand Air Force
- Type: Radar operations (1943–1944); Space operations (2025–present)
- Role: Early warning and fighter direction (1943–1944); Space force unit (2025–present)
- Size: 15 personnel (as of 2025)
- Part of: New Zealand Defence Force
- Garrison/HQ: Solomon Islands (1943–1944)
- Motto: Titiro ki ngā whetū (Look to the stars)
- Engagements: World War II

No. 62 Squadron RNZAF is the only space squadron of the Royal New Zealand Air Force and was reformed in July 2025. Historically, No. 62 Squadron was a radar squadron which operated in the Pacific from August 1943 to October 1944 and comprised all the RNZAF radar units sent overseas during the Second World War.

== History ==
=== Second World War ===
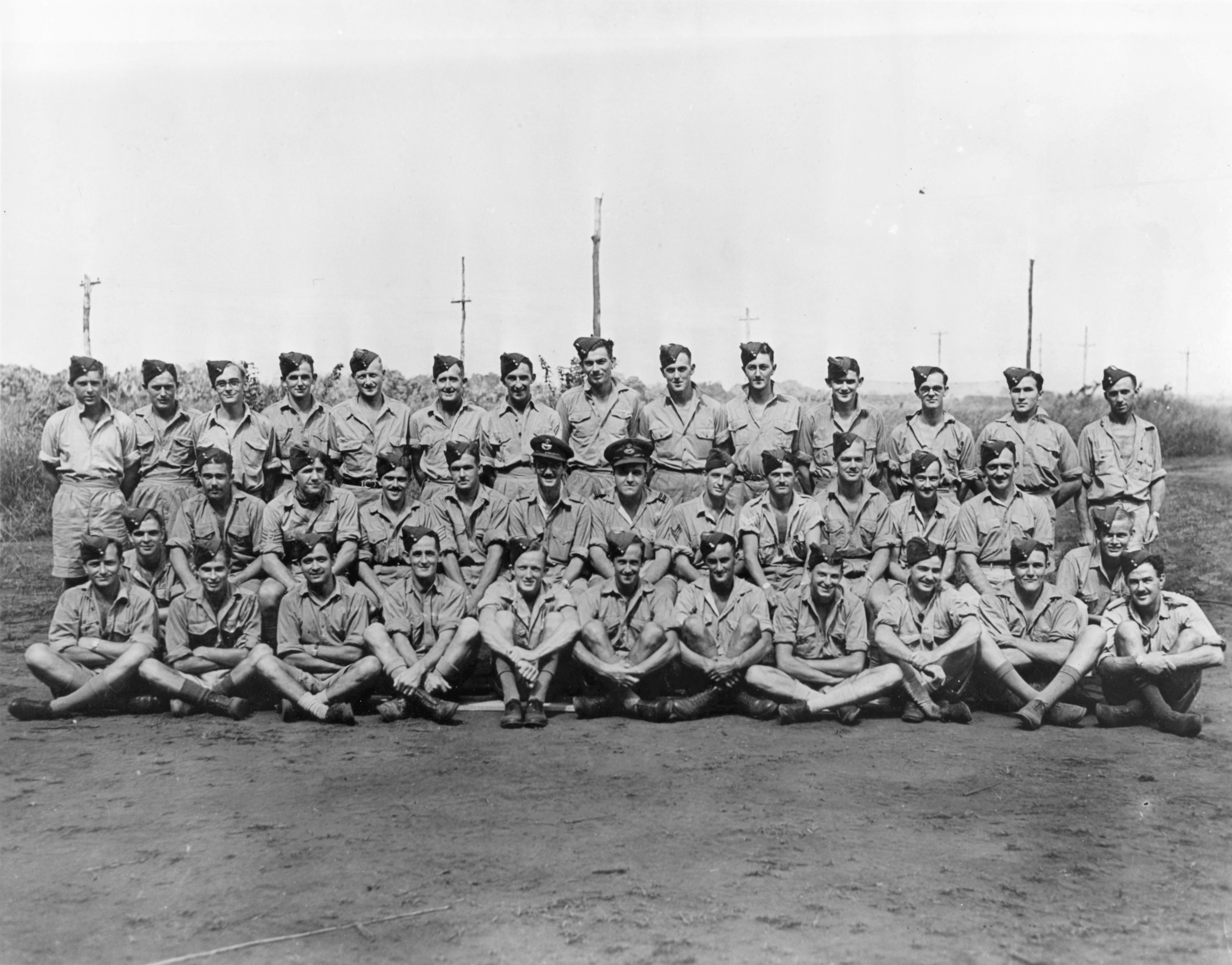
No. 52 Unit at Guadalcanal, September 1943

In January 1943 the Americans were short on ground based radar equipment in the pacific and asked New Zealand to supply one of theirs. No. 52 unit was therefore established to install and operate a Ground-controlled interception radar system at Guadalcanal. The system was operational by 21 March and over the coming months further radar units (No.s 53–59) were formed and deployed to the Pacific. In August 1943 No. 62 Squadron was formed to bring all of the radar units under a unified command. The Squadron's units were deployed throughout the Solomon Islands, including Guadalcanal, Malaita, Bougainville Island, Rendova Island and New Georgia. The radar units provided fighter direction to USAAF fighter squadrons in the area and early warning of incoming Japanese air raids. By mid 1944 the radar units were no longer necessary due to the effective elimination of Japanese air power in the Solomons. As most of the RNZAF men had completed their tours of duty and American radar equipment and personnel in the Pacific was deemed adequate, No. 62 Squadron was disbanded in October 1944. Some of the radar units (Nos. 52, 53 and 58), however, continued to operate independently until February 1945. No. 62 Squadron was the only New Zealand Radar Squadron to serve overseas.

=== Present ===
No. 62 Squadron was re-established on 4 July 2025 as the RNZAF's first space squadron with 15 personnel. Defence Minister Judith Collins said that the squadron would "initially focus on monitoring, analysing, and understanding space activity to safeguard national and international interests."
