= No. 6 Squadron RNZAF =

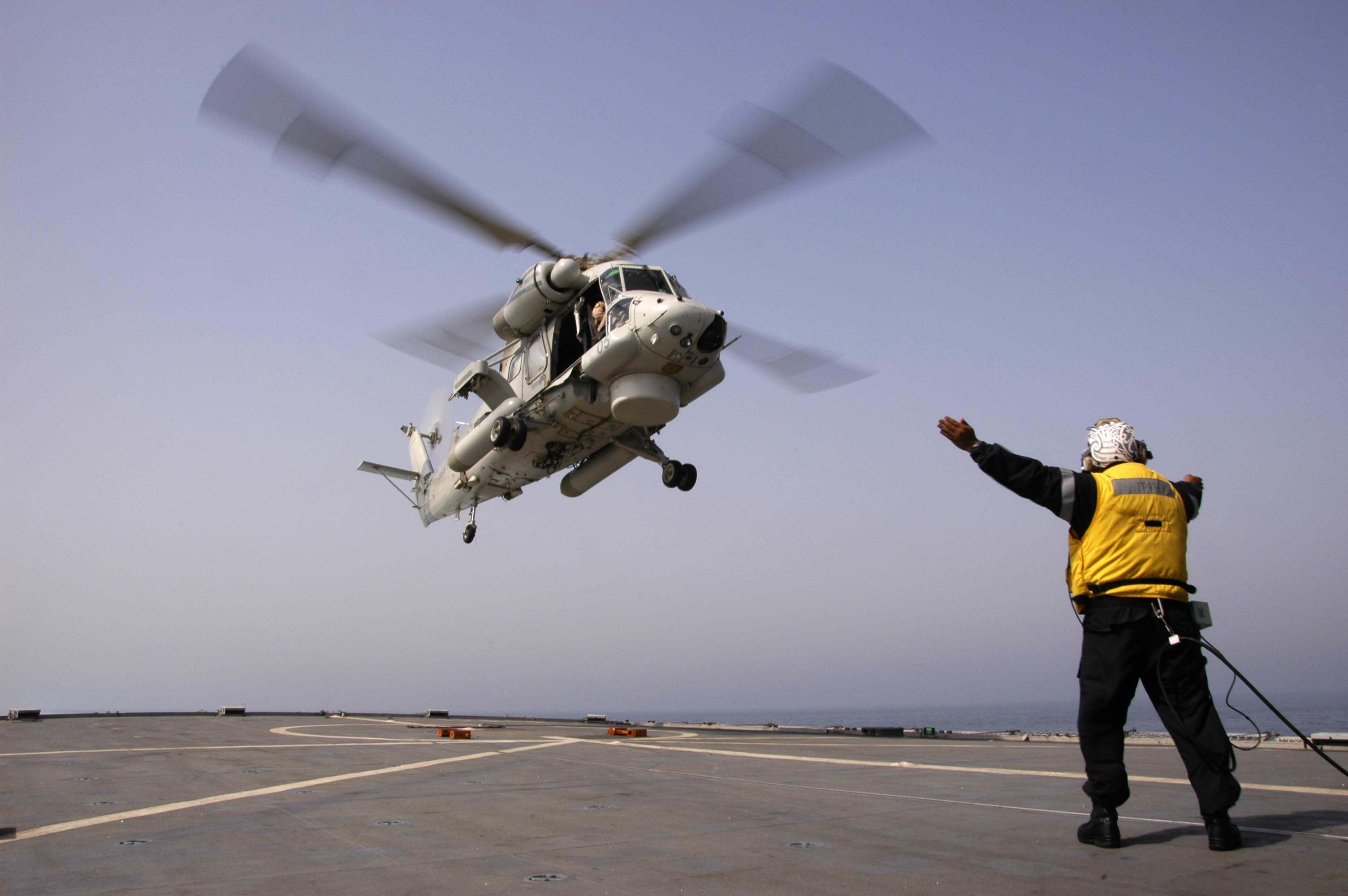
- A No. 6 Squadron SH-2G taking off from HMNZS Te Mana during a deployment to the Persian Gulf in 2008
- Active: February 1942 – August 1957; October 2005 – present
- Country: New Zealand
- Branch: Royal New Zealand Air Force
- Type: Naval aviation
- Role: ASW / maritime patrol
- Garrison/HQ: RNZAF Base Auckland
- Motto: Vigilance with patience
- Colors: Blue and grey
- Mascot: Hippocamp
- Anniversaries: 1 February 1942
- Equipment: Kaman SH-2G Super Seasprite
- Engagements: World War II, East Timor, Persian Gulf

Commanders
- Current commander: Commander Alex Trotter

Insignia
- Squadron badge: Maori God "Tane"

No. 6 Squadron RNZAF is a maritime squadron of the Royal New Zealand Air Force. It has a history going back to World War II, when it operated flying boats, and has been disbanded and re-formed several times through changes in the country's military structure. The squadron motto, originally "Fortitudine et Diligentia", is now “Vigilance with Patience”.

== History ==
=== World War II ===
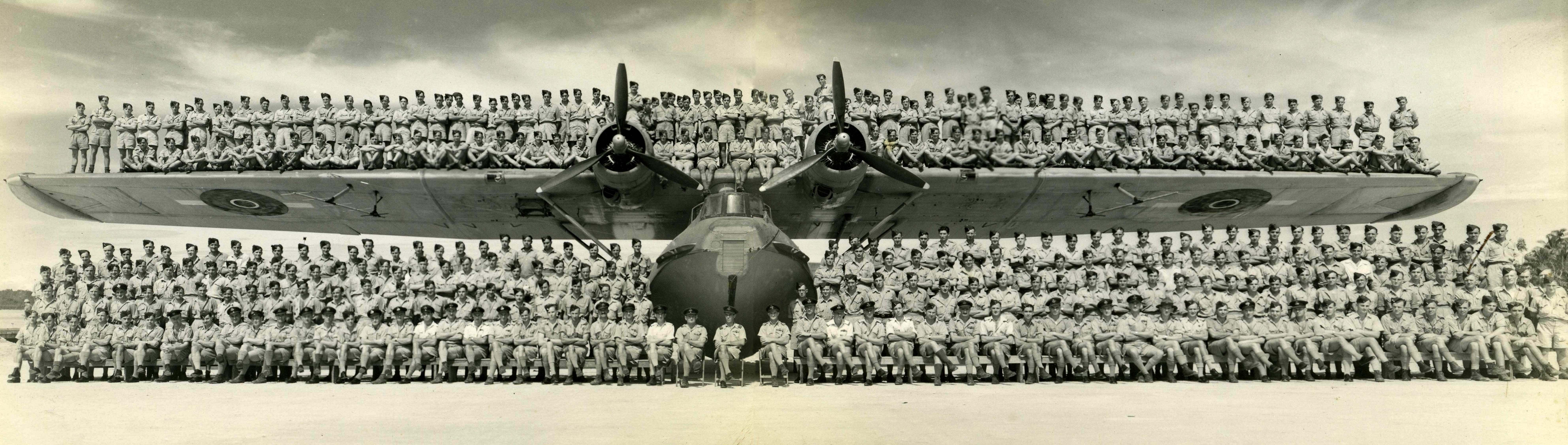
No. 6 Squadron personnel on a PBY-5 Catalina, 1944

Following Japan's entry into World War II in December 1941, the Royal New Zealand Air Force (RNZAF) had to switch from primarily training pilots to Europe into a combat force. No. 6 Squadron RNZAF was formed as an army co-operation unit at Milson in February 1942 flying Vickers Vildebeest and Hawker Hind aircraft. At the same time, No. 5 Squadron RNZAF moved to Fiji with Short Singapores and Vickers Vildebeest and Vincent biplanes.

Modern maritime patrol flying boats (and more Hudson light bombers) were requested under Lend Lease and after the first Consolidated Catalinas arrived in April 1943 a detachment of men from No. 5 Squadron was assigned to convert to these types as No. 6 Squadron. After the squadron became fully operational a detachment was sent to Tonga in mid-August 1943, where its main task was the protection of shipping. Later in the year the squadron moved west and north to be closer to the front line: first to the Segond Channel, Espiritu Santo on 1 October, and then, on 24 December, to Halavo Bay (on Florida Island, just north of Guadalcanal), which was to be its base for the rest of the war. Fed by a constant trickle of recruits from New Zealand, and Catalinas from San Diego (a total of twenty-two PBY5's and seven PB2B-1's), the squadron grew continuously during the war reaching a complement of 457 men in April 1944.

The Catalinas' endurance (12-hour flights were routine; some, with extra fuel, exceeded 17 hours), load capacity (more than 6 t), and ability to land on, and take off from, the open sea made them ideal for a wide range of tasks. Regular minor tasks included servicing remote radar stations (RNZAF Units 53 and 58), Coastwatchers, and a Mission Station on Malaita, but the two major tasks were maritime reconnaissance patrols (which turned out to be fruitless in terms of sightings of enemy ships and submarines), and air-sea rescues (codenamed Dumbo missions), with which the squadron made a substantial contribution, rescuing a total of 79 servicemen (68 US and 2 New Zealand airmen, plus 9 people from two US ships) in 25 separate missions. Two squadron pilots (Flying Officers W.B. Mackley and D.S. Beauchamp) were awarded DFCs for their skill and courage in carrying out open-sea landings and takeoffs in dangerously rough seas during Dumbo missions. When the merchant freighter USS Cape San Juan was torpedoed and sunk 300 miles south-east of Suva on 11 November 1943 the sea was too rough for landing but the Catalinas were able to aid rescue ships by dropping smoke flares to guide them to survivors. 1180 men were rescued over a 2-day period. The most intense period of the squadron's Dumbo activity occurred during the two months (early February to early April 1944) that a detachment from No. 6 Squadron was based at the US seaplane tender USS Coos Bay at the Treasury Islands, just south of Bougainville Island. The squadron's Catalinas accompanied allied bombers and fighters taking part in air strikes on Rabaul and rescued a total of 29 airmen from planes that were either shot down or forced down by equipment failure.

Two squadron members who later achieved prominence in other fields were Edmund Hillary, one of the first two men to climb Mt Everest, and Eric Heath, who became an artist, illustrator and editorial cartoonist. Sixteen men died on active service with No. 6 Squadron, all as a result of accidents rather than enemy activities. The squadron was disbanded overseas in August 1945. Squadron code letters were "XX".

After the war No. 6 Squadron was re-equipped with Short Sunderland flying boats as a Territorial Air Force unit and also operated float equipped Auster light aircraft. The squadron was disbanded in August 1957, with all Sunderlands transferring to No. 5 Squadron prior to their replacement by modern Lockheed P-3 Orion aircraft.

== Present ==
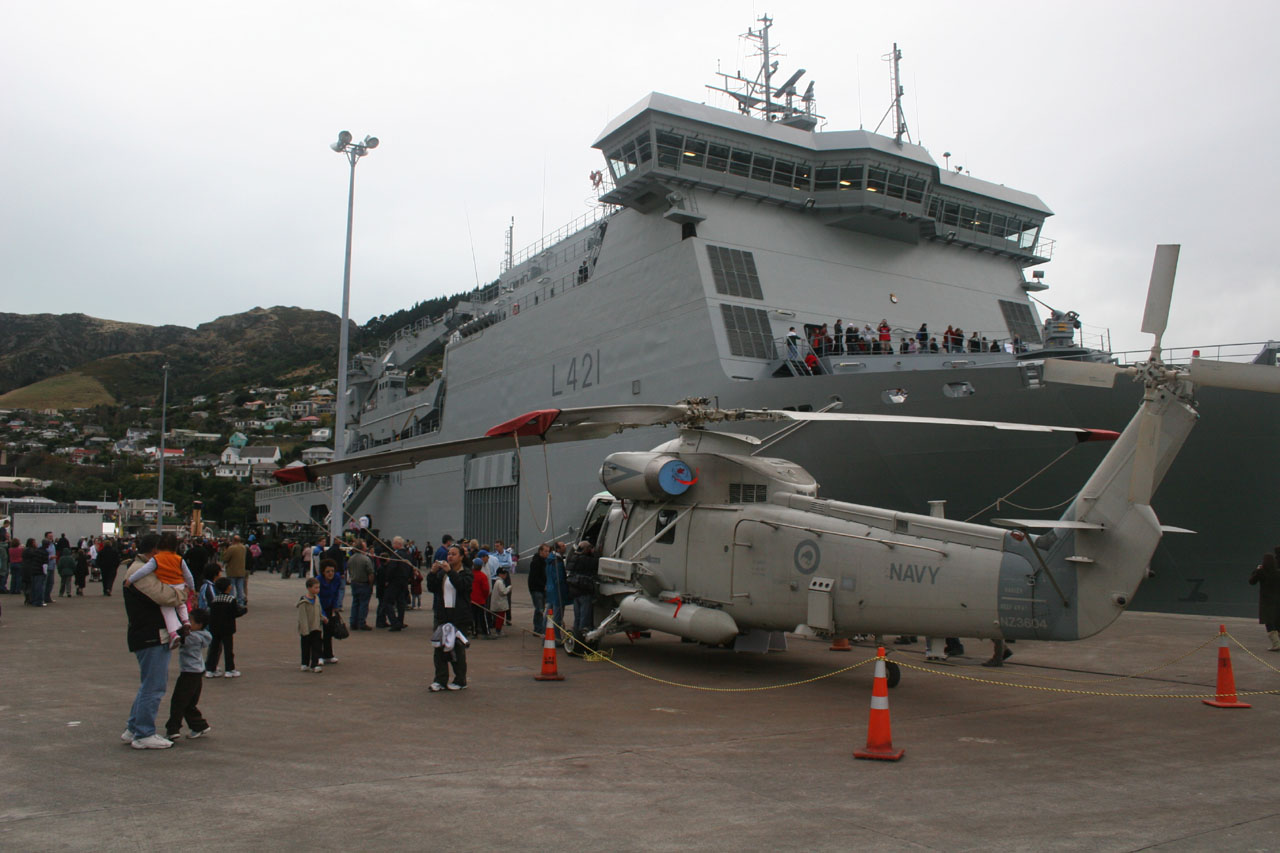
HMNZS Canterbury in 2007 with a SH-2G of No. 6 Sqn.

No. 6 Squadron was re-formed in 2005 to take over No.3 Squadron's role in operating the Royal New Zealand Navy's air element. No. 6 Squadron operates New Zealand's eight SH-2G(I) Seasprite helicopters. The squadron was re-established on 31 October 2005 by separating the Naval Support Flight from No. 3 Squadron RNZAF. The squadron is based at RNZAF Base Auckland.

6 Squadron is composed of Royal New Zealand Navy observers, pilots and helicopter loadmasters. Navy aircrew are trained by the RNZAF. The aircraft are maintained by RNZAF engineers, technicians and suppliers. RNZAF aircrew can also sometimes be posted to the squadron if required.

== Future ==
The Royal New Zealand Navy acquired ten SH-2G(I) Seasprites that replaced the existing SH-2G(NZ) aircraft in April 2015. Eight of the helicopters have entered active service representing a marked increase in capability while the other two are kept as spares.

The Seasprites are due to be replaced by 2027 as part of the 2015 Defence White Paper review. Helicopters such as the NFH-90, MH-60R Seahawk, AgustaWestland AW101, and the Agusta Westland Wildcat were being considered to replace the Seasprites.

In May 2025, Defence Minister Judith Collins announced that NZ$2 billion had been set aside to replace the Seasprites. In August 2025, it was announced that five MH-60R Seahawk helicopters would be acquired to replace the Seasprites, with a formal contract signing anticipated in 2026.

On 16 October 2026, New Zealand Ministry of Defence announced it had signed an agreement with the US government to purchase five MH-60R Seahawk helicopters, its mission systems, weapons. The programme has been allocated an capital investment of NZ $1.64 billion.

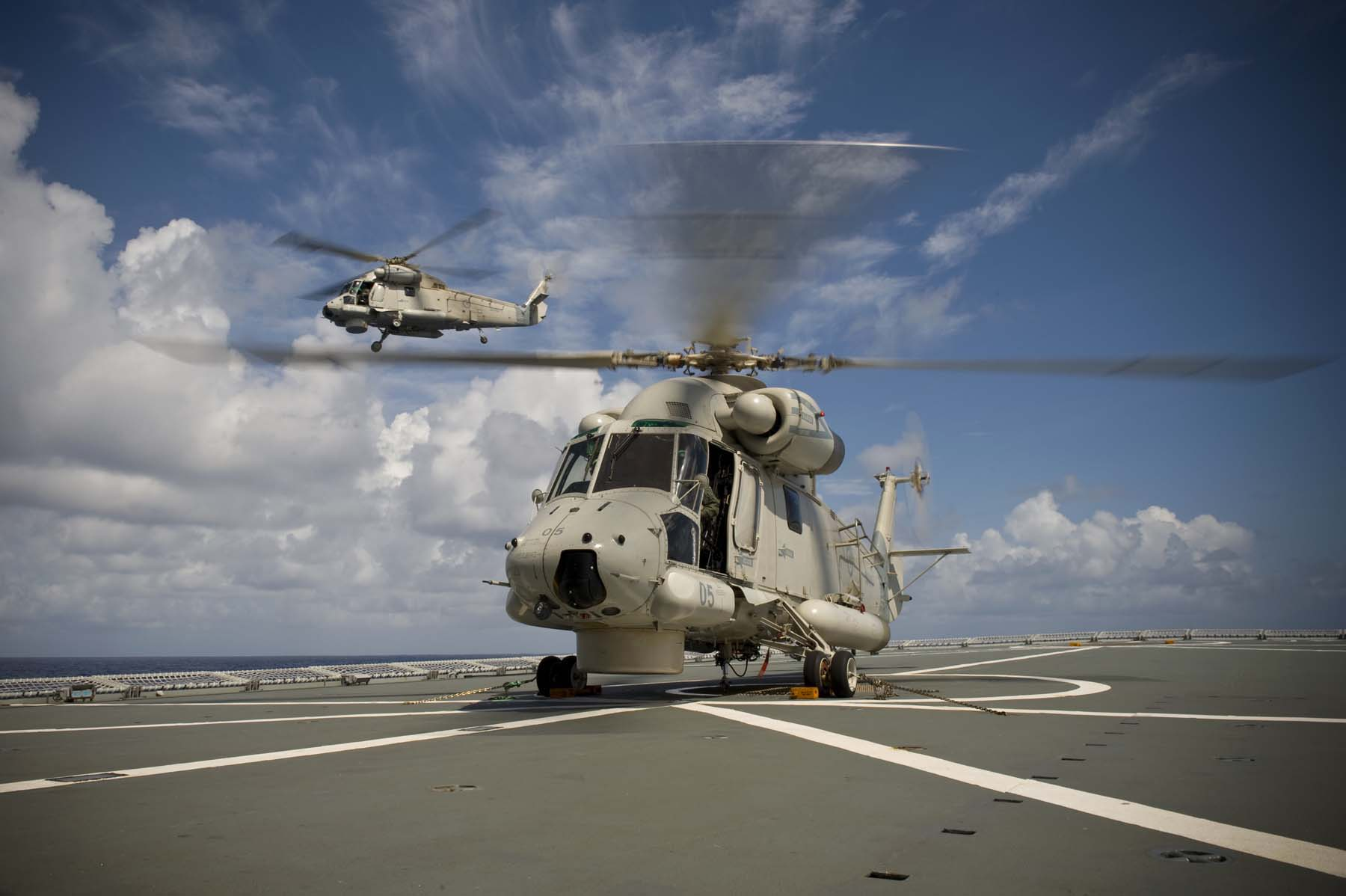
A pair of Seasprites operate from HMNZS Canterbury near the Puka-Puka Atoll
