= Waterfall Bay, Papua New Guinea =

Bay in Papua New Guinea

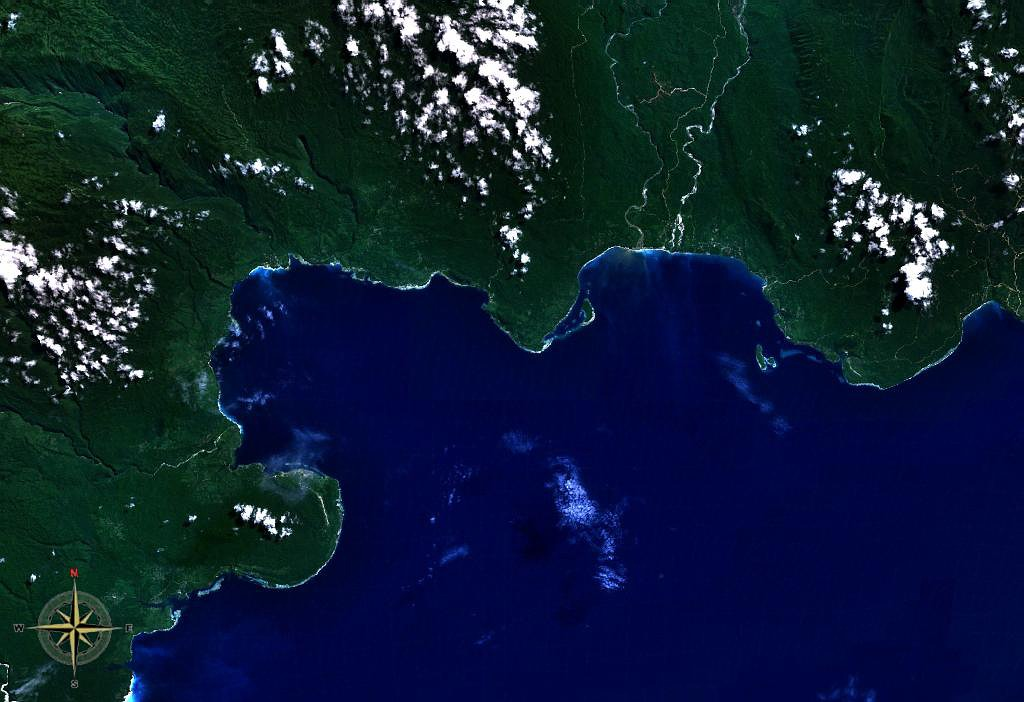
Jacquinot Bay and Waterfall Bay (east) seen from space

Waterfall Bay is a bay in East New Britain Province, south-eastern New Britain, Papua New Guinea, at 5.5666667°S 151.7°E. It lies to the east of Jacquinot Bay.

== Diving ==
The area has been knowing as a diving location, especially around the Mocklon Islands on the western tip of the Bay, near Cape Kwoi, as well as near the jetty in the local village of Matong.
