= No. 5 Squadron RNZAF =

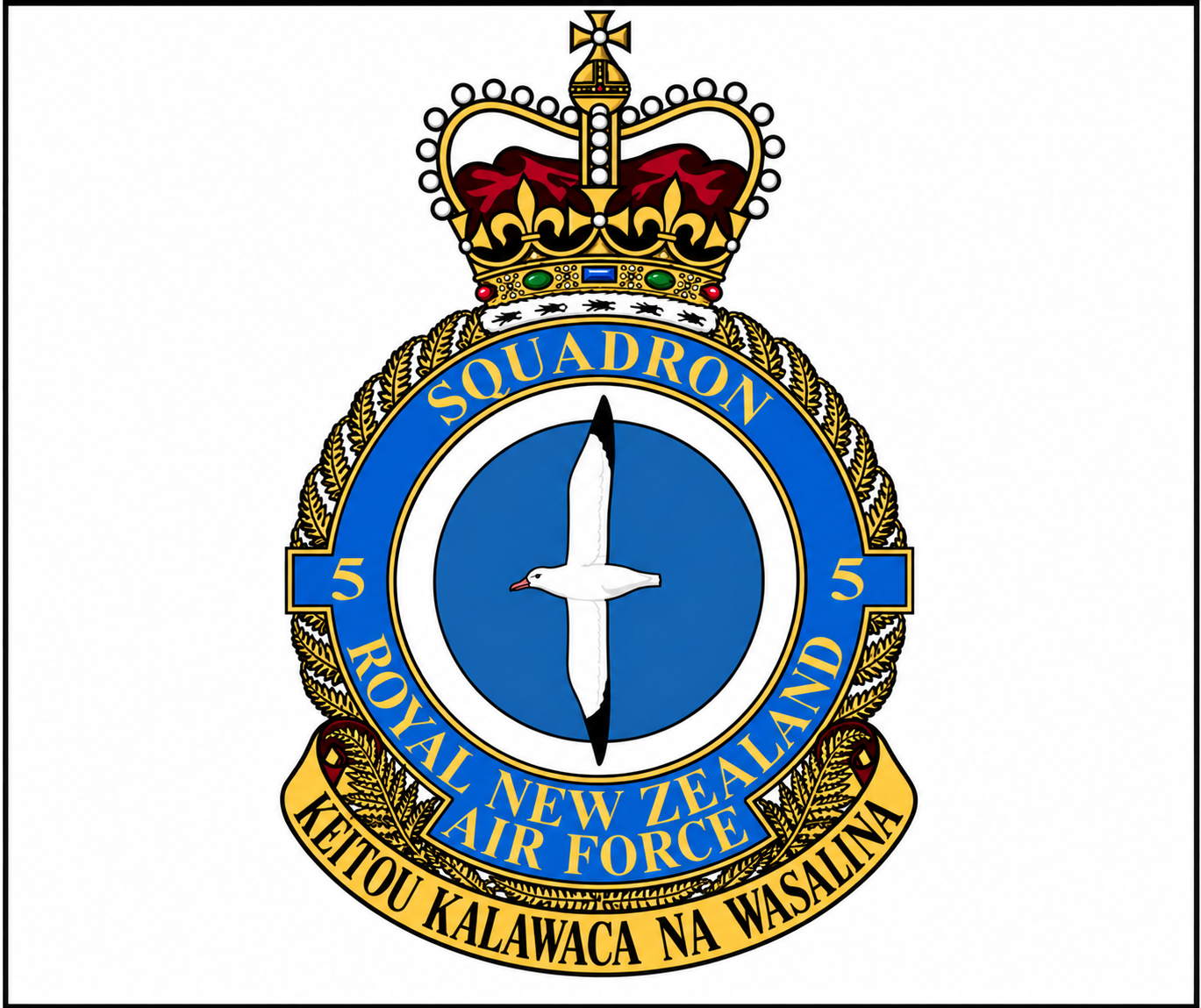
- Squadron Insignia
- Active: November 1941 – November 1942; July 1944 – present
- Country: New Zealand
- Branch: Royal New Zealand Air Force
- Role: Anti-ship/Anti-submarine warfare, Maritime patrol, Search and rescue
- Garrison/HQ: RNZAF Base Ohakea
- Mottos: Fiji: Keitou Kalawaca Na Wasaliwa (Translation: We span the ocean)
- Colors: Black and White
- Mascot: Albatross
- Anniversaries: 03 November
- Equipment: P-8 Poseidon
- Engagements: World War II; Operation Enduring Freedom

Commanders
- Current commander: Wing Commander Mark Chadwick

Insignia
- Squadron Badge: In front of a blue roundel, an Albatross volant facing sinister with its wings spread in flight
- Squadron Codes: OT (Nov 1941 – Nov 1942); PA (Jul 1944 – 1945); KN (1946–1955)

No. 5 Squadron RNZAF is a maritime patrol and anti-submarine warfare squadron of the Royal New Zealand Air Force. It operates the Boeing P-8 Poseidon from RNZAF Base Ohakea. The squadron was formed during the Second World War and has since been in continuous operation. A number of maritime patrol aircraft have been operated by the squadron over the course of its existence including the Short Singapore, Consolidated PBY Catalina, Short Sunderland and the Lockheed P-3 Orion.

== History ==
=== World War II ===
Initially, the squadron was equipped with Vickers Vincents. From the outbreak of hostilities with Japan, the squadron operated the Short Singapore Mk.IIIs (transferred in October 1941 from No. 205 Squadron RAF) mainly on maritime patrol and anti-submarine duties, rescuing more than fifty survivors of ditched aircraft and successfully attacking a Japanese submarine in the process with the elderly Singapores. These types were superseded by Consolidated PBY Catalinas, which aided the air-sea rescue capability. The squadron moved from Fiji in late 1944 to operate between Espiritu Santo and the Admiralty Islands. During this time the later conqueror of Mount Everest, Edmund Hillary, served with the squadron. In November 1944, the squadron moved to Luganville Seaplane Base on Espiritu Santo to carry out anti-submarine patrols and escort duty In August 1945, the squadron was withdrawn to Fiji.

=== Cold War ===
Following the war, the squadron was re-equipped with 16 Short Sunderland MR.5s and based at Laucala Bay, in the suburbs of Suva, Fiji, tasked with maritime surveillance "over the vast South Pacific Ocean, medical evacuation flights, and communications flights for the colonial administrators." From 1965, the squadron relocated to Whenuapai, Auckland, to re-equip with five Lockheed P-3B Orions in the anti-submarine role. The squadron withdrew its last flight of Sunderlands from Laucala Bay in 1967.

The P-3B fleet was upgraded in the mid 1980s (Project Rigel) with a more modern radar (APS-134), an IRDS camera, a digital computing bus, and electronic displays/information management system. They were subsequently redesignated P-3K. A sixth aircraft was purchased from the RAAF during the Project Rigel upgrade.

No. 5 Squadron won the Fincastle Trophy for anti-submarine work on a number of occasions, although in recent years the focus has shifted from anti-submarine warfare to broader maritime patrol and search and rescue missions.

In the late 1990s, Project "Sirius" aimed to upgrade tactical systems and sensors aboard the Orions. A shortlist of potential companies was issued on 9 December 1998 naming Lockheed Martin Tactical Defence System; Boeing; Raytheon Systems; and Dornier; the project was under way for several years; but eventually drew to a close without producing results.

=== Twenty-first century ===
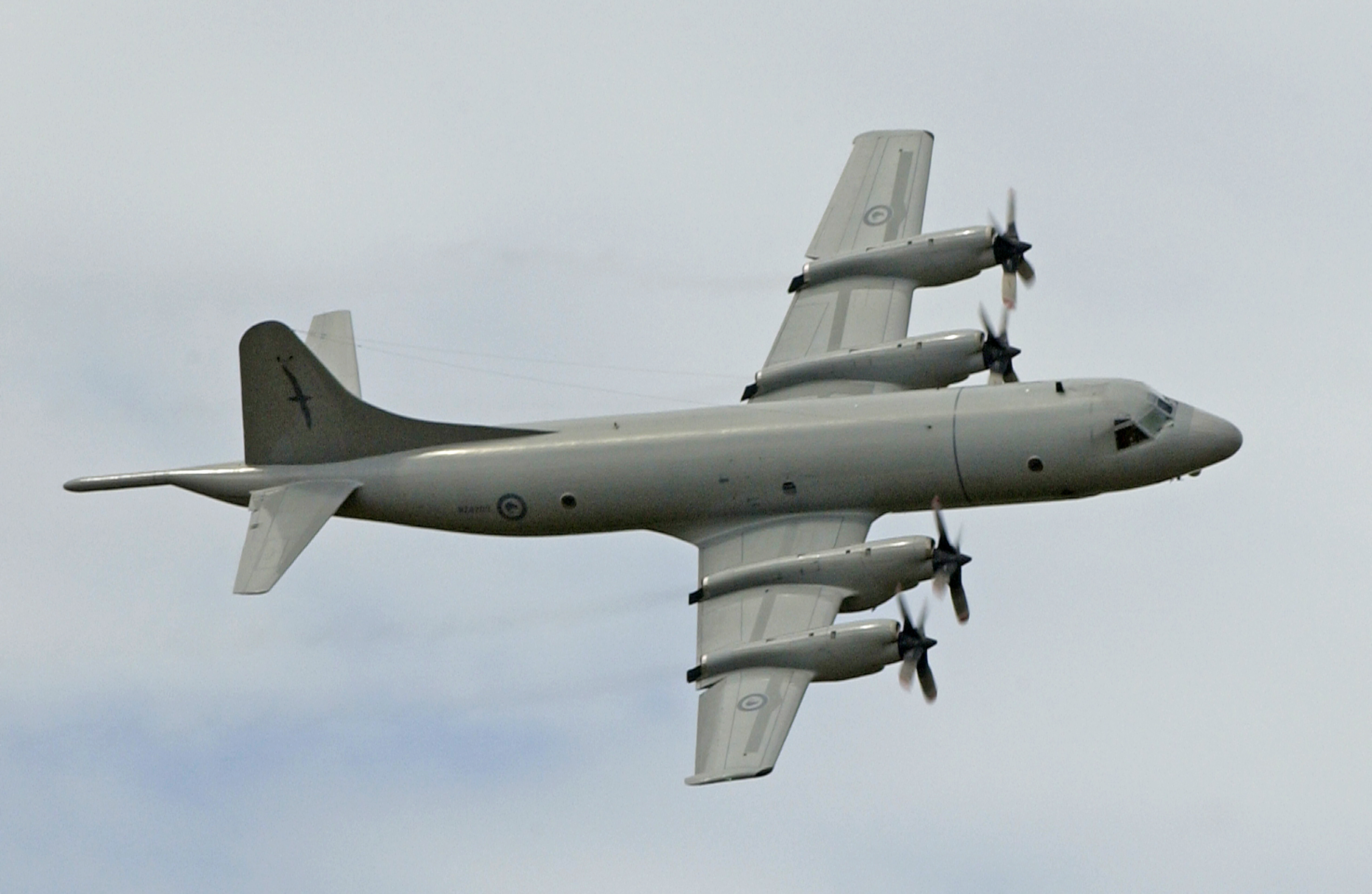
A P-3K in 2005

The aircraft have been deployed to assist international efforts on several occasions. From May 2003 to February 2004, a detachment operated in support of Operation Enduring Freedom by patrolling the Arabian Sea and Gulf of Oman.

In October 2004, a contract was signed with L-3 Communications Integrated Systems, of the United States, to upgrade the aircraft's communication, navigation and surveillance, and data management systems. The contract also included an upgrade of crew training, software testing and integration facilities, and mission preparation and analysis systems.

In 2005, the first of the six P-3K Orions began being upgraded to the new P-3K2 standard, modernising the avionics and mission systems.

In January 2006, No. 5 Squadron conducted trials to prove the aircraft could operate from Antarctica. This would improve capabilities to better police illegal fishing, and the trial occurred at a time when New Zealand was under pressure to intervene in the increasingly heated dispute between Greenpeace, Sea Shepherd Conservation Society, and Japanese commercial whaling ships.

In 2006, an Orion was used to photograph Raoul Island after a small volcanic eruption killed a Department of Conservation (DOC) worker.

On the 2 May 2011, the RNZAF accepted the first upgraded P-3K2 Orion from the Ministry of Defence. The aircraft is due to undergo a period of Operational Testing and Evaluation (OT&E) before commencing active use.

Following the disappearance of Malaysian Airlines flight MH-370 in March 2014, an RNZAF P-3K2 Orion was deployed to RAAF Base Butterworth to assist with the search for the Boeing 777. The Orion aircraft and crew was then re-tasked and conducted their operations from RAAF Base Pearce near Perth, Western Australia, searching the Southern Indian Ocean for MH-370 alongside other international aircraft and crews.

As of March 2015, all six RNZAF P-3K2 Orions are fully operational after their comprehensive upgrades.

In December 2015 the final aircraft and crew rotation returned from a 16-month operation deployed to the Middle East. The deployment supported Combined Maritime Forces in maritime security, anti-terrorism, anti-narcotics, and anti-piracy operations. The detachment completed over 170 missions and flew over 1400 hours.

The category five Tropical Cyclone Winston caused widespread damage to Fiji in February 2016. A RNZAF P-3K2 Orion was launched and conducted reconnaissance flights less than 24 hours after the cyclone had devastated the archipelago. The imagery captured from the P-3K2 Orion was published widely to raise international awareness of the humanitarian situation. This imagery was instrumental in determining the needs of the worst-hit areas in hours, rather than the days usually required for traditional ground surveys.

P-3K2 Orion aircraft conducted multiple surveys in 2017 of the Ambae volcano, located in the Vanuatu archipelago, following increasing levels of volcanic activity. This information was used to assist the Vanuatu National Disaster Management Office in preparation for major volcanic eruptions.

A P-3K2 Orion was deployed to the Pacific in January 2018 following the sinking of the MV Butiraoi, a Kiribati ferry carrying over fifty passengers. Seven survivors were located drifting in a dinghy, and their rescue was coordinated by the P-3K2 crew. In the seven years from 2010 to 2017, P-3K2 search and rescue operations have saved 119 lives, rescued 92 people, and assisted 67 people.

In February 2018 the final aircraft and crew rotation returned from a further deployment to the Middle East. Over the course of the deployment 135 missions and over 1000 hours were flown supporting Combined Maritime Forces. The deployment worked towards improving maritime security in the region, preventing piracy, and narcotics and weapons smuggling. During the deployment information provided by the P-3K2 Orion led to the seizure of over $700 million of heroin.

A P-3K2 Orion and crew were deployed to Japan in Sep-Oct 2018 and again in Oct-Nov 2019 to help implement United Nations Security Council resolutions against North Korea. The P-3K2 flew alongside international partners to detect maritime activity that contravened UN sanctions, in particular, ship-to-ship transfers.

The Government announced in October 2020 its decision to again deploy a P-3K2 Orion long-range maritime patrol aircraft to support implementation of United Nations Security Council (UNSC) resolutions imposing sanctions against North Korea. This was New Zealand's third deployment of a P-3K2 following previous deployments during October- November 2019 and in September–October 2018.

== P-8A Poseidons ==
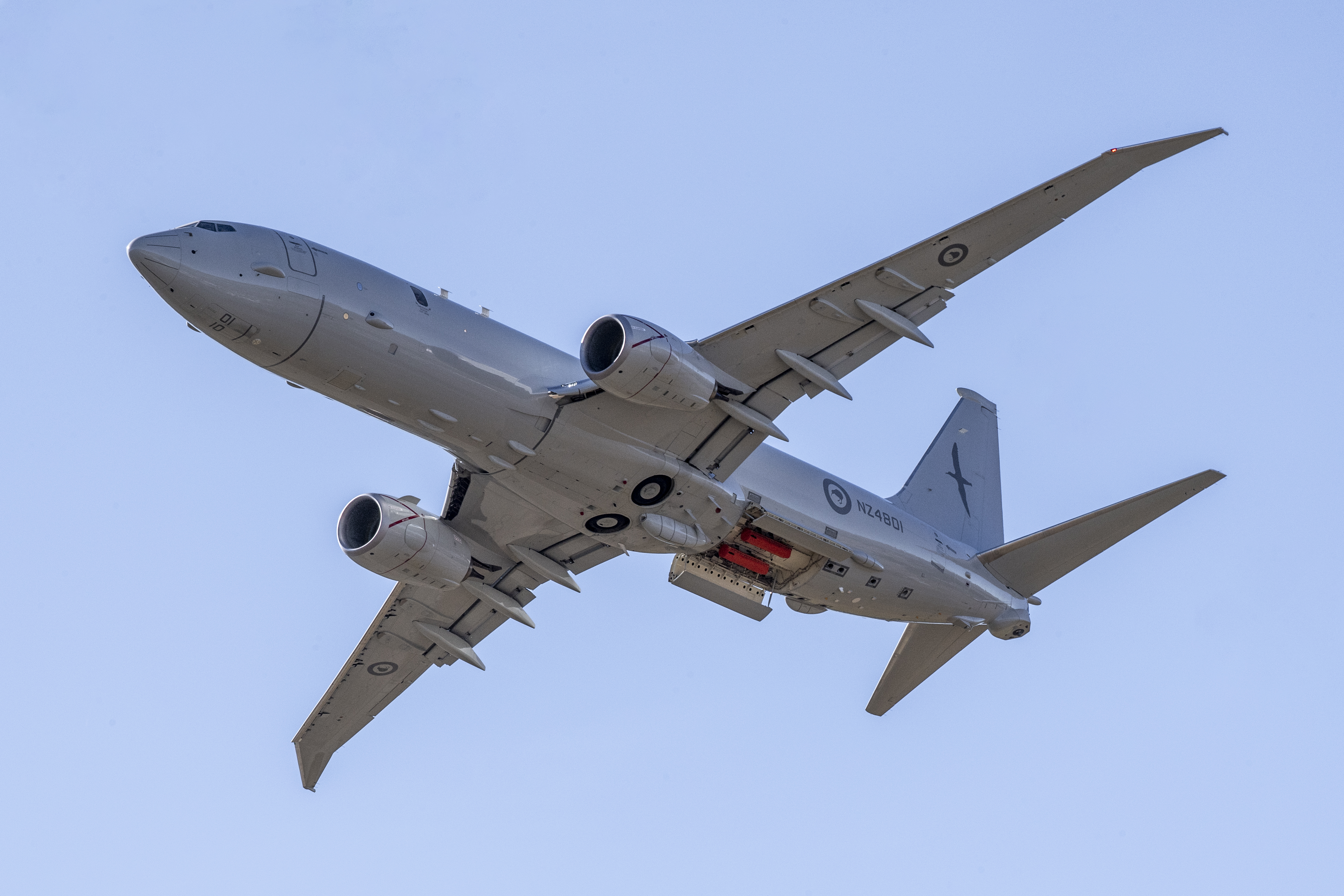
A RNZAF P-8A during Warbirds over Wanaka 2024, with an open bomb bay

In April 2017 it was revealed that the New Zealand Government was considering buying four Boeing P-8A Poseidon maritime patrol aircraft from the United States to replace the Orions. On 9 July 2018 the government confirmed the purchase, with the Poseidon to be delivered and operational by 2023, requiring relocation of the squadron to RNZAF Base Ohakea.

The first P-8A Poseidon was delivered in December 2022 and the last two of the P3K2 Orions were retired in January 2023. The second P-8A was delivered in March 2023 and the remaining two aircraft were expected to be delivered by mid-2023. The final of the four Poseidons was delivered in July 2023.

== Photo gallery ==
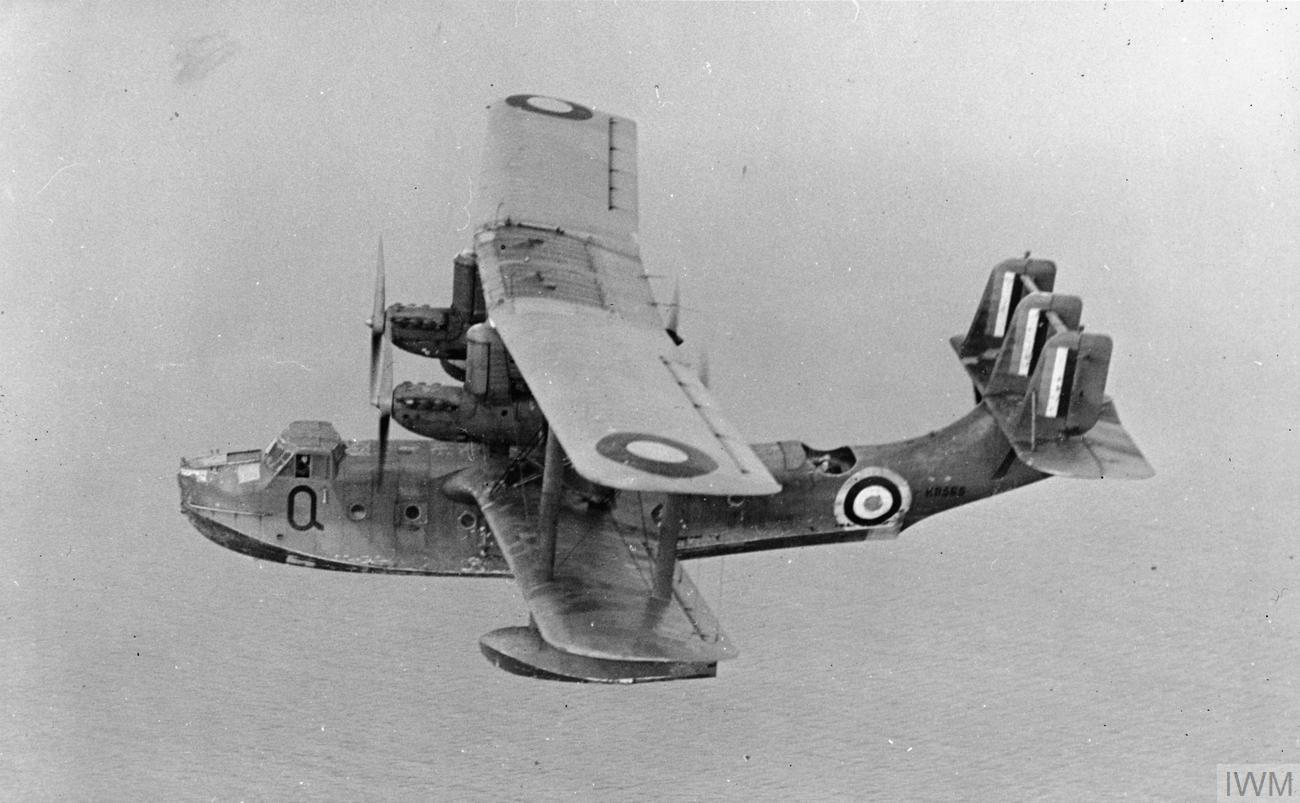
The Short Singapore III flying boat.

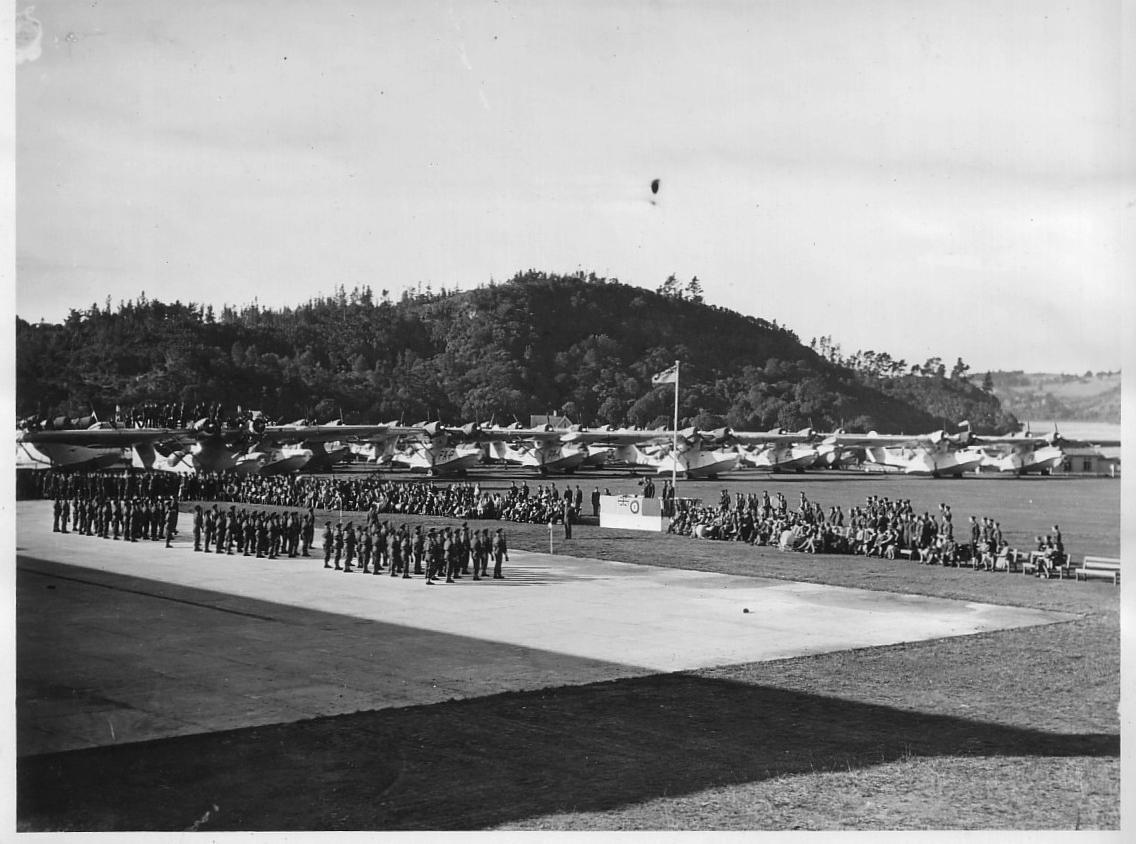
No. 5 Sqn Consolidated Catalinas.

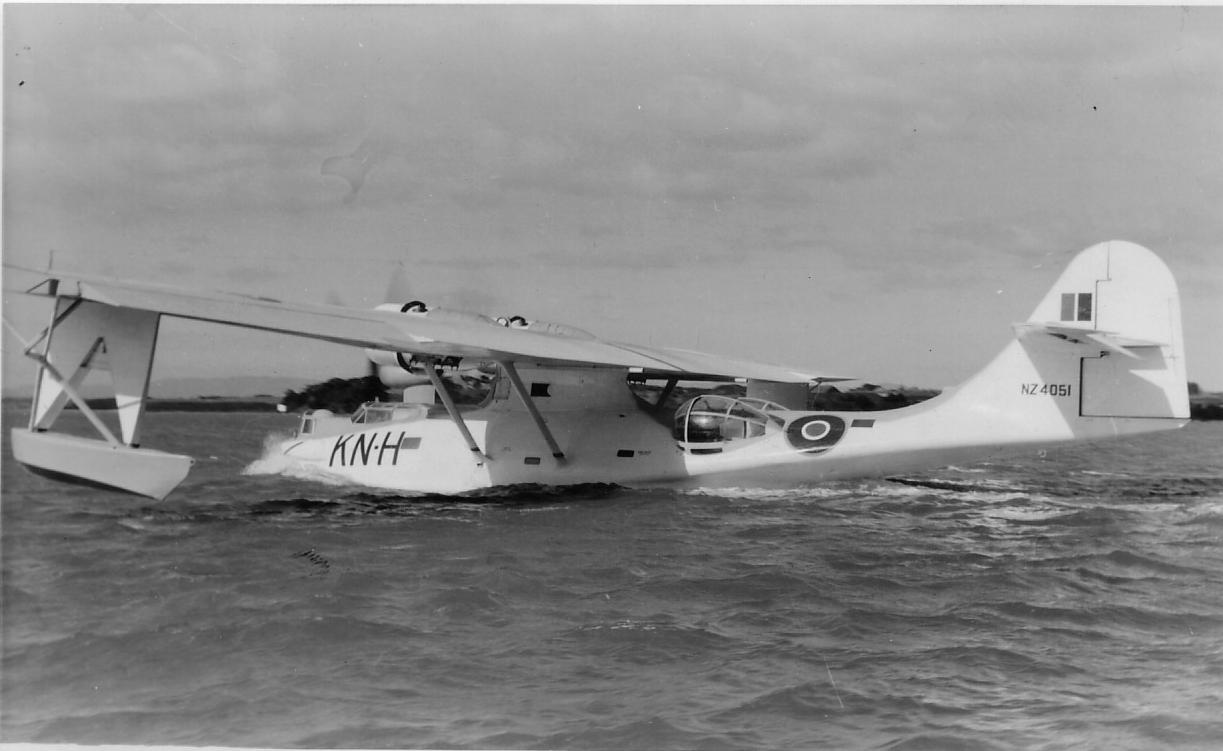
A No. 5 Sqn Catalina in the immediate post war period.

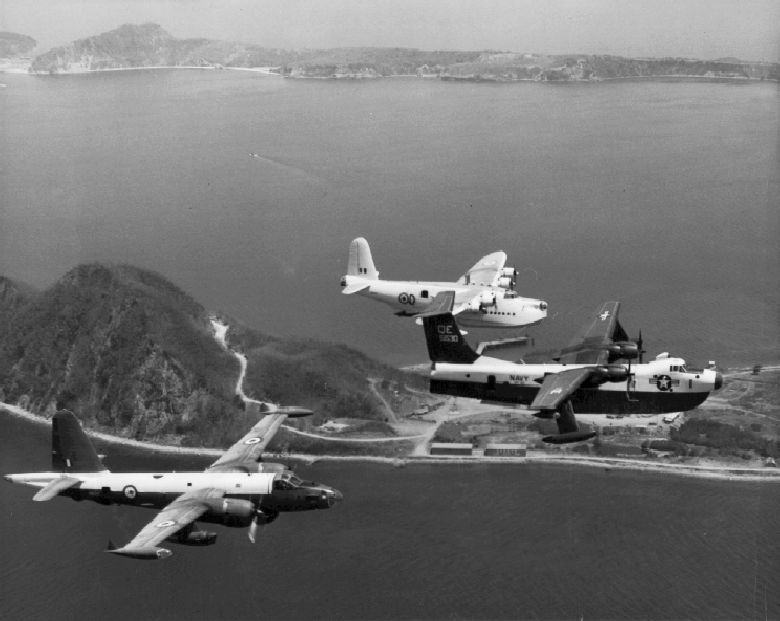
No. 5 Sqn Short Sunderland with USN P-5 Marlin and RAAF P-2 Neptune in 1963.

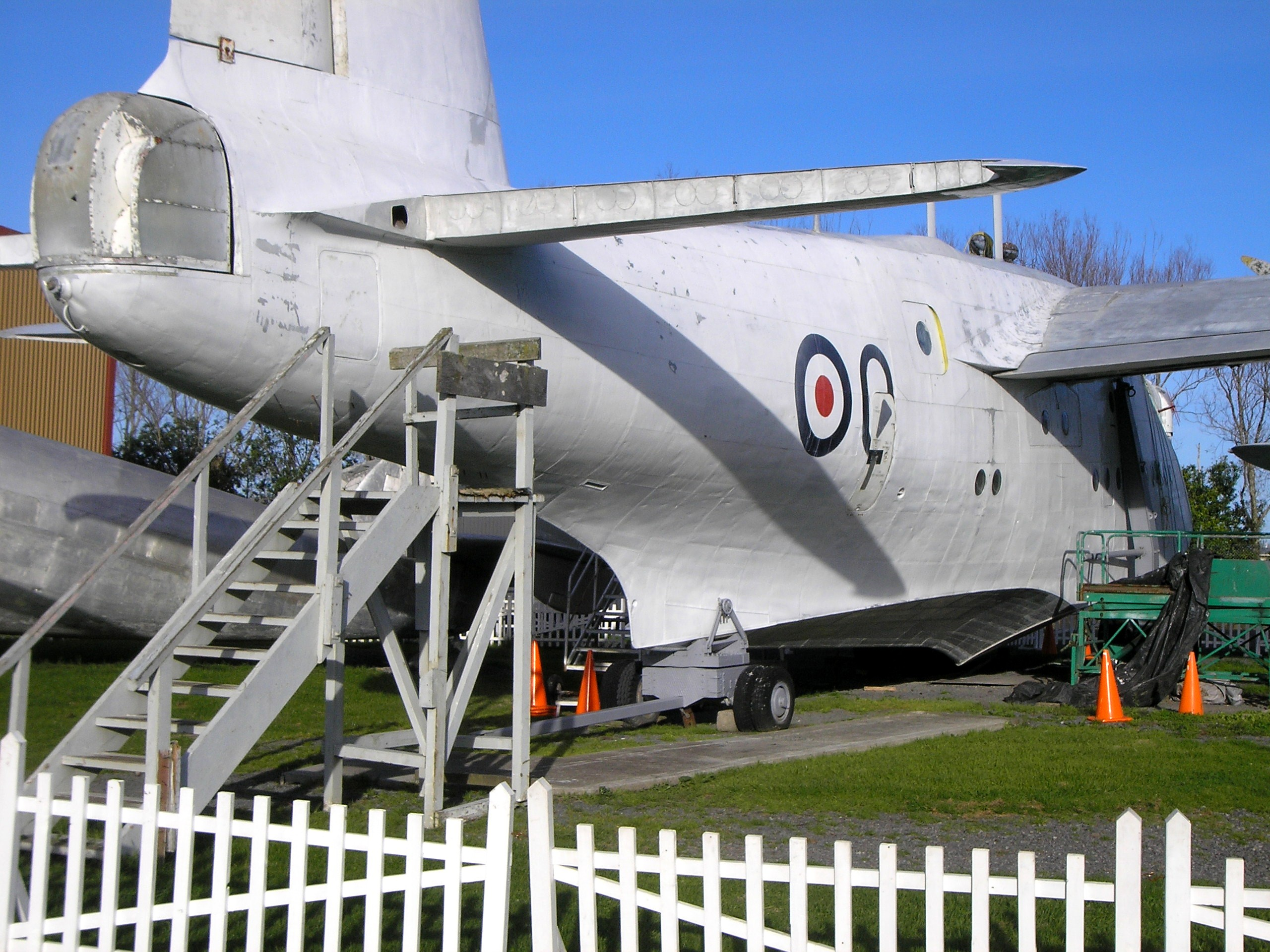
An ex-No. 5 Sqn Sunderland at New Zealand's Museum of Transport and Technology (MoTaT).

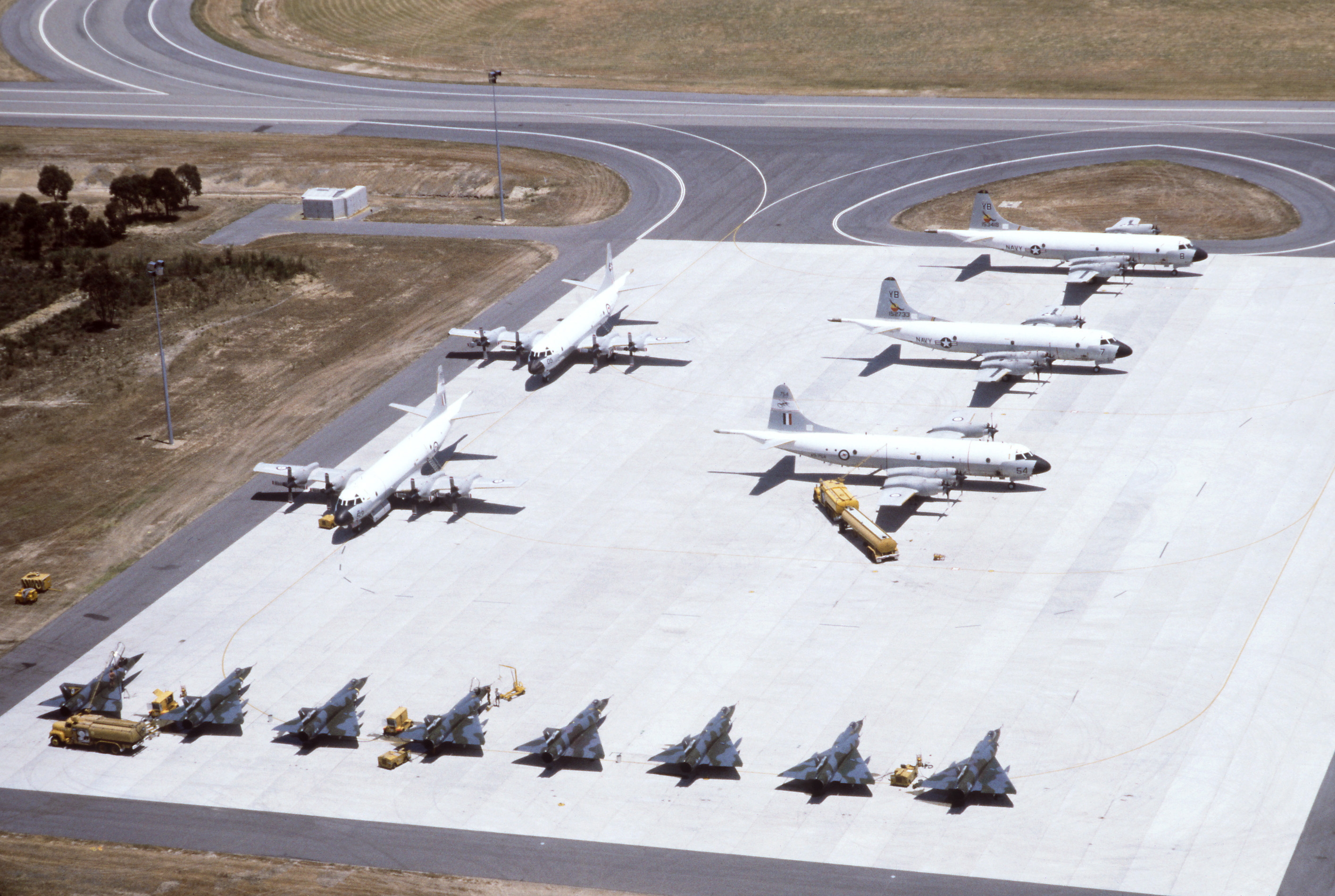
No. 5 Sqn P-3Bs during a 1982 exercise with USN and RAAF units.
