= New Zealand contribution to the Battle of Normandy =

New Zealanders who served in the Normandy Campaign in WWII

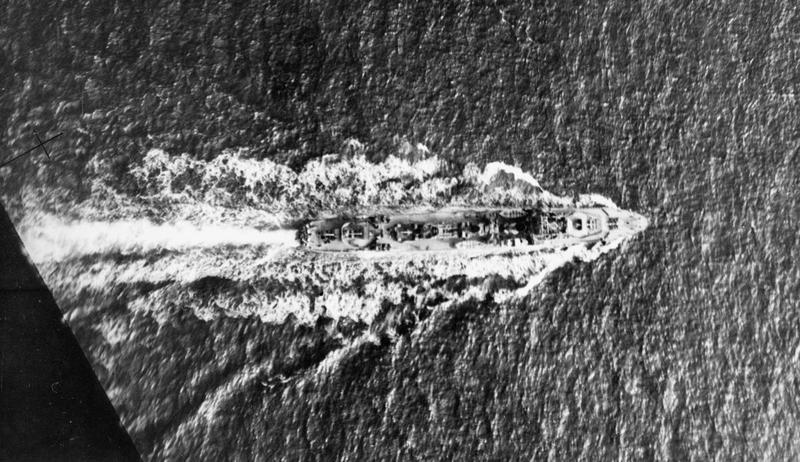
10 New Zealanders were killed on HMS Isis, a Royal Navy destroyer which hit a mine on 20 July 1944 off the Normandy coast

New Zealand's contribution to the Battle of Normandy included an estimated 10,000 men serving under British command, predominantly through the Royal Air Force and Royal Navy, as well as New Zealanders serving in the Merchant Navy and other Allied formations.

== Background ==
New Zealand entered World War II on 3 September 1939, hours after the United Kingdom declared war on Germany following the invasion of Poland. About 140,000 men and women served overseas, 104,000 in the 2nd New Zealand Expeditionary Force, the rest in either British or New Zealand naval or air forces. In total, 194,000 men and 10,000 women served in the armed forces. New Zealand suffered 35,000 casualties, including almost 12,000 killed.

By 1944, the 2nd Division was fighting in Italy rather than north-west Europe, and therefore did not participate in the landings. Many New Zealanders nevertheless participated in the landings through other Allied services and formations. Large numbers of these men served in the RAF, RN, Merchant Navy, and other Commonwealth formations. Therefore, New Zealand personnel still took part in the Normandy campaign even though no dedicated New Zealand Army formation participated in the landings.

== Royal Air Force ==
Since the beginning of the war, New Zealand airmen had served in the Royal Air Force, and had participated in the Battle of Britain in RAF squadrons, as Article XV Squadrons had not yet been established. 127 men served, of whom 20 were killed. One important figure was Sir Keith Park, who led the RAF's No. 11 Group and was nicknamed "The Defender of London".

By 1944 more than 6,000 New Zealanders were based in the United Kingdom, serving in the RAF. In the lead up to the invasion, New Zealand squadrons in the RAF spent the months attacking railways, bridges, radar sites and transport networks across German-occupied France as part of the Allied transportation plan. By mid-1944, there were seven New Zealand Article XV Squadrons in the RAF, and four of them took part in the Normandy campaign:

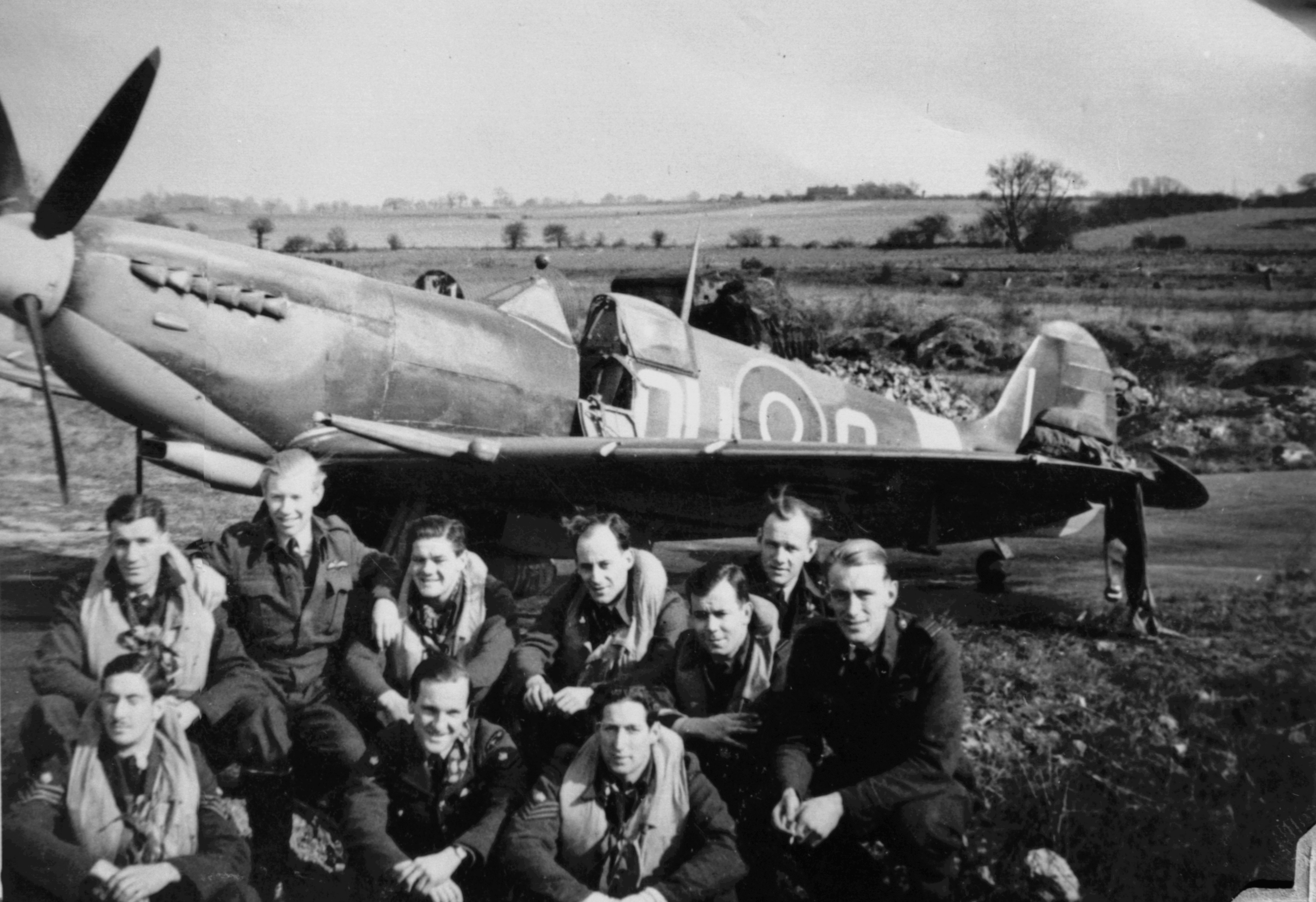
A group of No. 485 Squadron pilots at Selsey, on D-Day, 6 June 1944

No. 485 Squadron RNZAF, flying Spitfires. The squadron provided fighter cover and beachhead patrols, and operated from Caen-Carpiquet in late August. It was the only designated 'NZ' squadron based in France during the war.

No. 486 Squadron RNZAF, flying Tempests. The squadron performed Tempest fighter-bomber operations, armed reconnaissance, and attacks on transport and infrastructure.

No. 488 Squadron RNZAF, flying Mosquitos. The squadron performed strikes on railways, bridges and communications.

No. 487 Squadron RNZAF, also flying Mosquitos. It conducted night fighter and intruder operations during the Normandy Campaign.

A Spitfire from No. 485 Squadron was credited with shooting down the first German aircraft over the Normandy beachhead, with pilot Johnny Houlton shooting down a Ju.88 bomber on the afternoon of 6 June near Omaha Beach.

Many New Zealanders serving in the RAF were also among the crews of Dakotas and gliders, which carried airborne troops before the amphibious landings on 6 June. Many other New Zealanders were spread throughout RAF bomber, fighter, coastal and transport units, rather than serving in the distinct New Zealand squadrons.

== Royal Navy ==
By 1944 more than 4,700 New Zealanders were serving on Royal Navy ships, and on 6 June New Zealand naval personnel served aboard vessels of the main invasion fleet. These included the landing craft and offshore ships that bombarded the coastal defenses. No Royal New Zealand Navy ships participated during the Normandy landings or the campaign, but New Zealand Merchant Navy ships did take part.

Isis in Malta

On 20 July 1944, six weeks after D-Day, I-class destroyer HMS Isis struck a sea mine eight kilometers northeast of Courseulles-sur-Mer whilst operating off the coast of Normandy. The ship sank at a depth of 20 meters with the loss of 11 officers and 143 ratings, including 10 New Zealanders: seven ordinary seamen, two able seamen and a petty officer radio mechanic. HMS Hound found and rescued 21 men, though one subsequently died.

== Merchant Navy ==
Many New Zealanders served in the United Kingdom's Merchant Navy but two New Zealand ships took part in the invasion and its logistics, Monowai and the Aorangi.

Prior to the Second World War, Monowai was part of the Union Steam Ship Company of New Zealand. From 1940 to 1943 she served as an armed auxiliary cruiser before being converted to a troop transport. During the D-Day landings in France, Monowai landed elements of the 8th Canadian Infantry Brigade at Juno Beach. After the landings, the Monowai crossed the English Channel more than 40 times from Southampton to France to continuously deliver reinforcements and equipment throughout the campaign. In total, she transported more than 70,000 Allied troops during the Normandy campaign.

Before the outbreak of war, Aorangi was owned by the Canadian-Australasian Line. By October 1940, she had been converted to a troopship, and by 1941, the UK Ministry of War Transport requisitioned her. She did not land troops during the Normandy landings, but she still made significant contributions to the invasion. Aorangi was fitted out and used as a depot ship in 1944 and renamed HMS Aorangi. She acted as a floating base for a fleet of 150 tugs involved in the towing of the artificial Mulberry harbours across the English Channel. The ship also provided supplies and spare parts, engine repairs, and hospital facilities for hundreds of wounded troops brought back from the landing beaches.

== Individuals ==
Several individual New Zealanders made significant contributions to the campaign by land, sea and air.

=== James Hargest ===
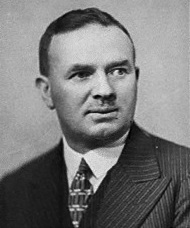
Hargest in 1935

James Hargest had served in World War I attaining the rank of lieutenant colonel by the end of the war. In World War II, he took command of 5th Infantry Brigade during the battles of Greece, Crete and Operation Crusader. Following his escape from an Italian prisoner of war camp in 1943, Hargest returned to Britain and was selected as New Zealand's official observer with the Allied forces preparing for the invasion of Normandy. He was attached to the British 50th Division and landed on Gold Beach on 6 June. As New Zealand's official observer, he spent his time moving between front-line units under heavy fire and recording accounts of the campaign. Hargest was killed by shellfire on 12 August 1944 and he is buried at Hottot-les-Bagues War Cemetery.

=== Edward "Ned" Hitchcock ===
Ned Hitchcock was one of over 10,000 New Zealanders serving with the Royal Air Force at the time of the Normandy landings. He was one of 28 New Zealanders recruited by the RNZAF to work on coastal radar in Britain. His role during the landings was to establish and maintain coastal radar installations to provide air interception, radar tracking, and communications for the Allies. He landed on Omaha Beach alongside American troops once the sector was clear. However, the lorry carrying his radar equipment drove off the ramp into deep water, causing the engine to stall. In the end, 12 men were killed and 40 were wounded from his party.

=== John "Jack" Ingham ===
Jack Ingham was born in Petone on 31 December 1920. He trained at HMNZS Philomel in 1940 and was subsequently shipped to the UK. He reported to HMS Royal Ulsterman in July 1941. On 6 June, he was the commanding officer of Landing craft tank 7071 and participated in the assault on Sword Beach. Ingham was awarded the Distinguished Service Cross 'for landing troops on the beach under heavy fire'.

=== James "Joe" Stellin ===
Stellin was one of thousands of New Zealanders who flew with the Royal Air Force in support of the D-Day landings. He was born in Wellington on 2 July 1922. He joined the Royal New Zealand Air Force in 1942 and was posted to 609 Squadron RAF at RAF Thorney Island three days before D-Day alongside two other New Zealand pilots. During the Normandy campaign, 609's pilots flew numerous missions over Normandy, targeting German radar stations, tanks and other vehicles. On 19 August 1944, after moving base to France, the squadron, including Stellin, flew operations against German transport attempting to escape the Falaise pocket. After destroying several tanks and trucks, Stellin was heading home when he asked permission to descend to attack a vehicle. His Typhoon is believed to have been hit by flak and his aircraft began losing altitude over the village of Saint-Maclou-la-Brière. Stellin manoeuvred his aircraft away from it before it crashed outside the village, killing him. His funeral was attended by 1,200 people from the surrounding area and he was posthumously awarded the Croix de Guerre avec Palme the following year.
