= Royal New Zealand Air Force =

Air force component of the New Zealand Defence Force

- Te Tauaarangi o Aotearoa (Māori)
- Badge of the Royal New Zealand Air Force; Royal New Zealand Air Force symbol
- Founded: 1913; 113 years ago (first military aviation); 1923; 103 years ago (New Zealand Permanent Air Force); 1 April 1937; 89 years ago (Independent service)
- Country: New Zealand
- Type: Air and space force
- Role: Aerial warfare
- Size: 2,518 active personnel 463 reserve personnel 44 aircraft
- Part of: New Zealand Defence Force
- Headquarters: Defence House, Wellington
- Motto: Per Ardua ad Astra
- March: Royal New Zealand Air Force March Past
- Anniversaries: 1 April 1937
- Engagements: World War II; Berlin Airlift; Malayan Emergency; Indonesia–Malaysia Confrontation; Korean War; Vietnam War; Iran/Iraq War; Gulf War; Somalia; Rwanda; East Timor; War in Afghanistan (2001–2021)
- Website: airforce.mil.nz

Commanders
- Commander-in-Chief: Governor-General Dame Cindy Kiro
- Chief of the Defence Force: Air Marshal Tony Davies
- Chief of the Air Force: Air Vice-Marshal Darryn Webb
- Deputy Chief of the Air Force: Air Commodore Daniel (DJ) Hunt

Insignia
- Roundel

- Fin flash

- Ensign

Aircraft flown
- Helicopter: AgustaWestland A109, SH-2G, NH90
- Patrol: Boeing P-8, Super King Air
- Trainer: T-6 Texan II, Super King Air
- Transport: Boeing 757, C-130J Super Hercules

The Royal New Zealand Air Force (RNZAF; Māori: Te Tauaarangi o Aotearoa) is the aerial service branch of the New Zealand Defence Force. It was formed initially in 1923 as a branch of the New Zealand Army, being known as the New Zealand Permanent Air Force, becoming an independent air force on 1 April 1937.

The RNZAF fought in World War II, Malaya, the Korean War, Vietnam and the Gulf War and has undertaken United Nations peacekeeping missions. From a peak of over 1,000 combat aircraft in 1945, the RNZAF has shrunk to a strength of 44 aircraft in 2026. It focuses on maritime patrol and transport duties in support of the Royal New Zealand Navy and the New Zealand Army. Its air combat capability ended in 2001, with the disbanding of the A-4 Skyhawk and Aermacchi MB-339 equipped squadrons.

The Air Force is led by an Air Vice-Marshal who holds the appointment of Chief of Air Force. The RNZAF motto is the same as that of the Royal Air Force, Per Ardua ad Astra, meaning "Through Adversity to the Stars". The Māori language name Te Tauaarangi o Aotearoa, meaning "New Zealand Warriors of the Sky" or more literally "The New Zealand War Party of the Sky", was adopted in 2009; the name had been Te Hokowhitu o Kahurangi ("War Party of the Blue") for the previous 12 years.

== History ==
New Zealand's military aviation began in 1913 when the New Zealand Army was presented with two Blériot monoplanes by the United Kingdom. Both aircraft were handed back after war broke out.

=== World War I ===
In the Great War, New Zealand aircrew flew as part of the Royal Flying Corps (British Army), British Royal Naval Air Service, and the Australian Flying Corps. New Zealand pilots serving with British Empire forces saw service in all theatres.

The government assisted two private schools to train pilots for the conflict. The Walsh brothers flying school at Auckland was founded by Leo and Vivian Walsh—pioneers who had made the first controlled flight in New Zealand. From 1915 pilots trained on the Walsh Brothers Flying Boats including Curtiss machines, aircraft of their own design and, later in the war, the first two aircraft made by Boeing.

In 1916, Sir Henry Wigram established the Canterbury Aviation Company at Sockburn, Christchurch, and purchased Caudron biplanes from Britain for pilot training. He gave the aerodrome, later Wigram Aerodrome, to the government for defence purposes.

At the end of the war many New Zealand pilots stayed with the new Royal Air Force (RAF) and several had attained high rank by the outbreak of World War II. Others returned to New Zealand and, serving part-time, provided the nucleus of the New Zealand Permanent Air Force (NZPAF).

=== New Zealand Permanent Air Force ===
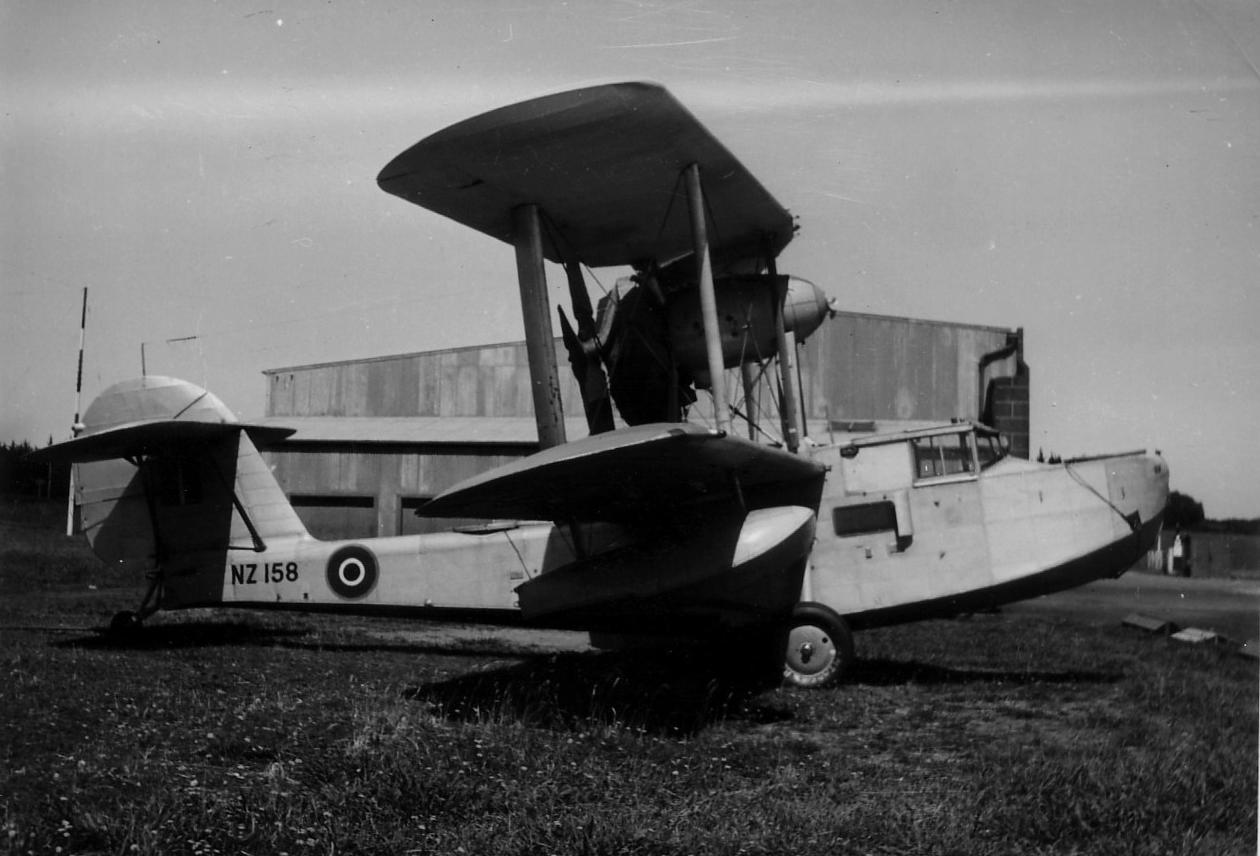
Supermarine Walrus of the RNZAF's seaplane training flight

At the close of hostilities Great Britain offered an Imperial Gift to each of the Dominions of a hundred war-surplus combat aircraft. New Zealand was the last to respond and least enthusiastic. When the 33 total aircraft, Avro 504s, Bristol F.2 Fighters and, De Havilland designed, Airco DH.4s and Airco DH.9s, did reach New Zealand they were either placed in storage or loaned to the flying schools, barnstormers and commercial operators.

The importance of aviation in warfare was belatedly recognised, largely thanks to the efforts of visionary parliamentarian Sir Henry Wigram. On 14 June 1923 the New Zealand Permanent Air Force (NZPAF) was gazetted: a part of the Army initially staffed by a total of four officers and two other ranks as full-time staff, plus the New Zealand Air Force with 102 officers on the Reserve lists. It was initially equipped with the surviving Avro 504K, the DH.4s, DH.9s and Bristol Fighters. These operated from an airfield outside Christchurch at Sockburn. In 1926 Wigram donated £2,500 for the purchase of modern fighters and Gloster Grebes were acquired. Sockburn was later renamed RNZAF Station Wigram, a name adopted by the suburb which grew up around the airfield. It is the site of the present Royal New Zealand Air Force Museum.

A trickle of new-build Bristol Fighters and other new types joined the NZPAF in the late 1920s and early 1930s. A Lewis gun-equipped De Havilland Gipsy Moth floatplane took part in naval operations against rebels in Samoa. The NZPAF's first action came in 1930 when the Moth dropped an improvised bomb made out of a treacle tin on to a ship suspected of gun-running. The bomb did no damage, and the target turned out to be a local missionary vessel. A territorial wing of the New Zealand Air Force was raised in 1930 with three squadrons at RNZAF Station Hobsonville (with flights at Hamilton and Napier), Wellington and Christchurch though without equipment. A fourth squadron planned for Dunedin had still not been raised by July 1939. Fairey IIIFs were involved in a maritime rescue, and in the aftermath of the Napier earthquake the NZPAF flew in urgently needed supplies and medical equipment.

Like other western air arms a major expansion began from the mid-1930s. The NZPAF ordered twelve Vickers Vildebeests in 1933–34 to form two bomber-reconnaissance flights at Hobsonville and Wigram. In 1937 29 Blackburn Baffins were purchased specifically to equip the Territorial Air Force for coastal reconnaissance work. An initial shipment of 16 Vickers Vincent bomber-reconnaissance biplanes arrived in July 1939. The NZPAF was renamed the Royal New Zealand Air Force in 1934 and became an independent service in 1937.

=== World War II ===
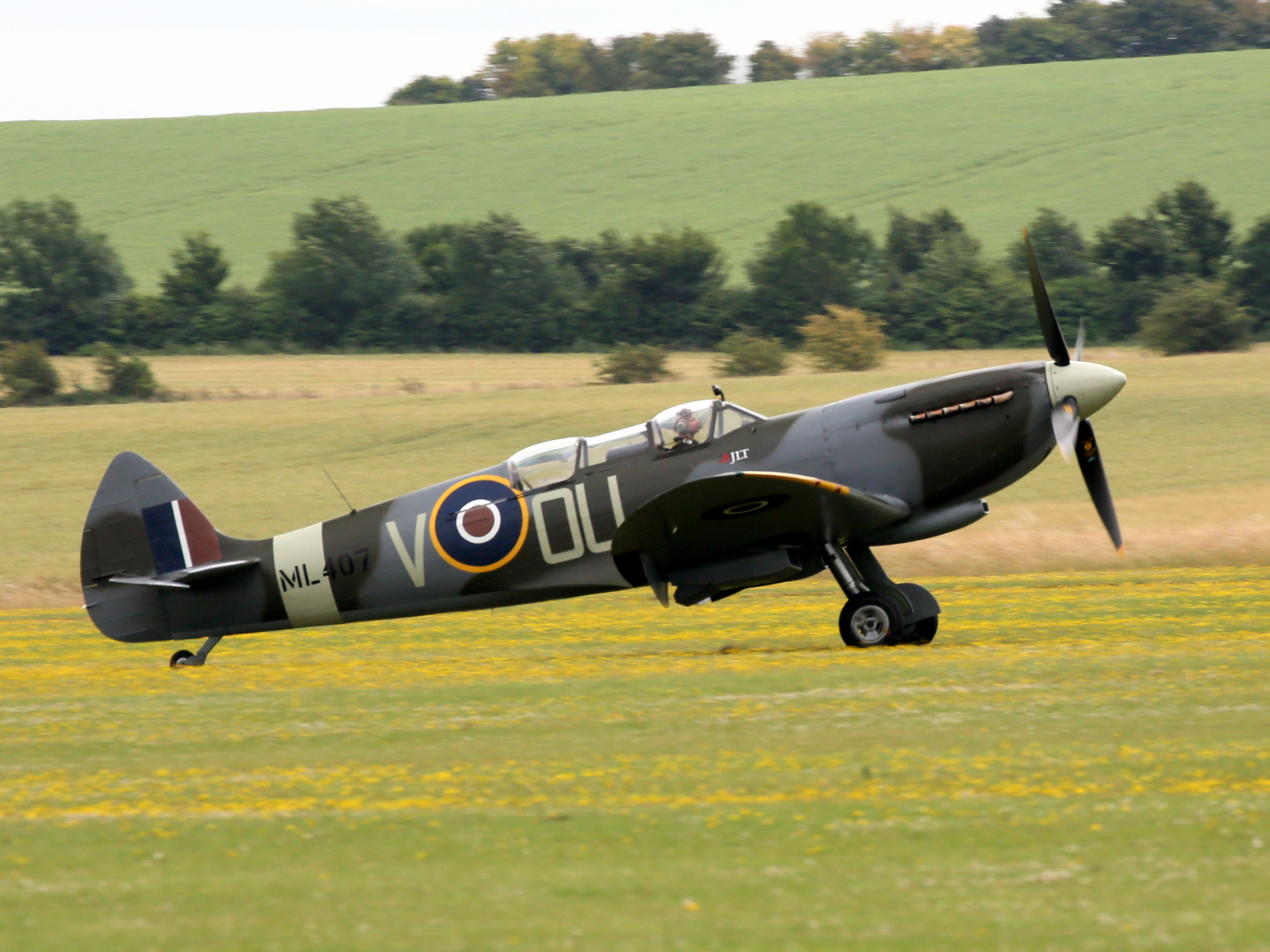
The restored Mk IX Spitfire once flown by NZ ace Johnnie Houlton DFC. It was converted to a dual configuration in 1946.

At the outbreak of World War II the primary equipment of the RNZAF was to be 30 Vickers Wellington bombers ordered in 1938. The aircraft were completed, and RNZAF crews were training on them in the UK in 1939; but with the outbreak of war in Europe increasingly likely, the New Zealand government offered the aircraft with their crews to the United Kingdom in August 1939. They became No. 75 (New Zealand) Squadron RAF within No 3 Group. Many other New Zealanders were serving in the RAF.

The primary role of the RNZAF was to take advantage of New Zealand's distance from the conflict by training aircrew as part of the Empire Air Training Scheme, alongside the other major former British colonies, Canada, Australia and South Africa.

New Zealanders serving with the RAF

The majority of RNZAF personnel served with RAF units, six RNZAF Article XV squadrons, which were RNZAF units attached to RAF formations, and the Royal Navy's Fleet Air Arm (FAA). They served in Europe, the Mediterranean, South East Asia and other theatres. Commonwealth personnel under RAF operational control were pooled for operational practicality and many RNZAF airmen also served with Royal Australian Air Force or Royal Canadian Air Force Article XV squadrons. New Zealanders in the RAF itself included pilots, such as the first RAF ace of the war, Flying Officer Cobber Kain and Alan Deere (whose book Nine Lives was one of the early post-war accounts of combat); and leaders such as the World War I ace, Air Chief Marshal Sir Keith Park, who commanded No. 11 Group RAF in the Battle of Britain and went on to the air defence of Malta (and, in the closing stages of the war, Commonwealth air units under South East Asia Command) and Air Marshal Sir Arthur Coningham Air Tactical Commander during the Normandy landings in June 1944 (Coningham and Park had remained with the RAF after WWI). Three RNZAF pilots were awarded the Victoria Cross while serving with the RAF. James Allen Ward, a Sergeant Pilot with 75 Squadron, was first, when he climbed out onto the wing of his Vickers Wellington bomber to smother an engine fire in flight on 7 July 1941. In 1943 then Wing Commander Leonard Trent continued to lead an extremely hazardous, but vital, attack at the head of 487 Squadron until every aircraft was shot down. The same year, Flying Officer Lloyd Trigg, serving with No. 200 Squadron RAF was piloting a Consolidated B-24 Liberator bomber when it encountered a U-boat on the surface off the African coast. He attacked U-468 but as he did so, the aircraft was hit by the U-boat's anti-aircraft fire and burst into flames. The aircraft continued the attack and sank the U-boat but crashed shortly afterwards, with all the crew being killed. The crew's actions were reported by the U-boat's survivors, and the Victoria Cross was awarded as a result.

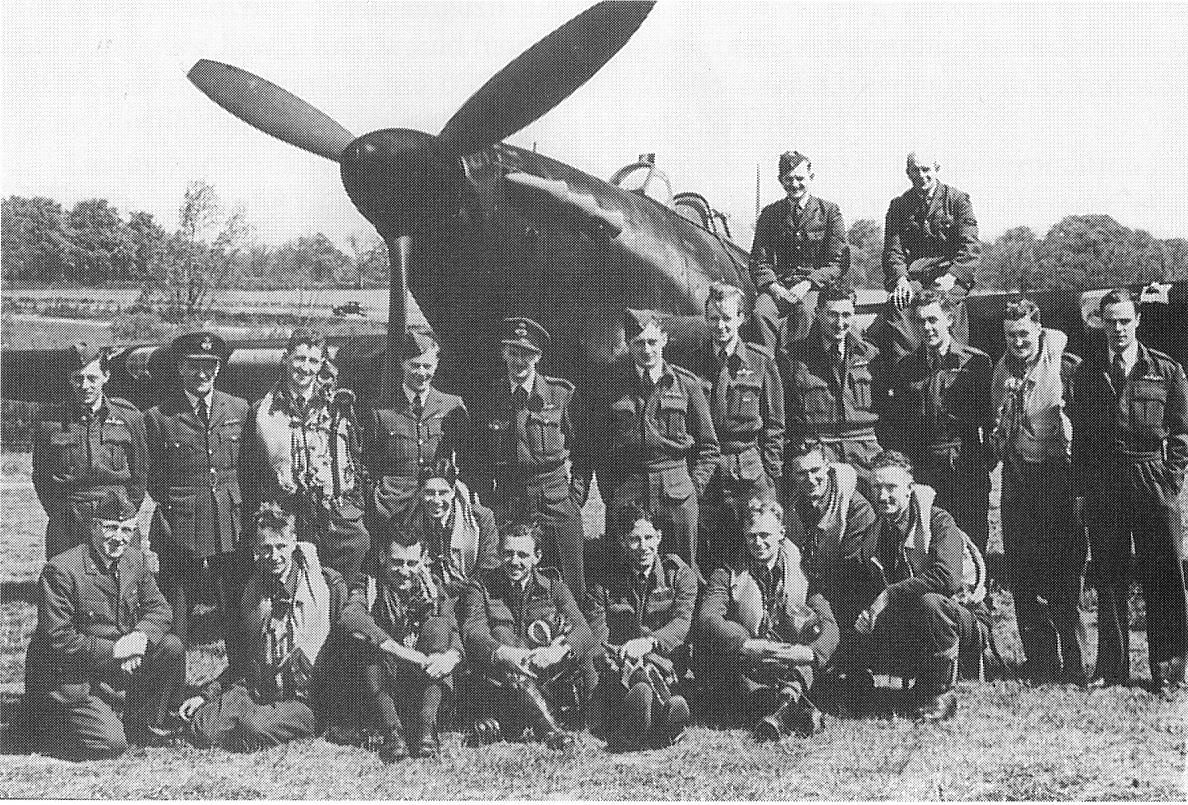
Hurricane night fighter pilots of No. 486 Squadron at Wittering in 1942

The first NZ squadron to serve with the RAF was not strictly an Article XV squadron. No. 75 Squadron RAF was formed by RNZAF aircrews and Vickers Wellington bombers in August 1939. The squadron later flew Short Stirlings, Avro Lancasters and Avro Lincolns. Through accident or design, other RAF units came to be mostly manned by RNZAF pilots, including No. 67 Squadron RAF (which ace Geoffrey Fisken served with) and No. 243 Squadron RAF in Singapore, No. 258 Squadron RAF in the UK. Several Grumman Martlet and Grumman Hellcat units of the FAA also had New Zealanders in their ranks, leading some texts to claim these types were used by the RNZAF.

New Zealand Article XV Squadrons included No. 485, which flew Supermarine Spitfires throughout the war; No. 486 (Hawker Hurricanes, Hawker Typhoons and Hawker Tempests); No. 487, (Lockheed Venturas and de Havilland Mosquitoes); No. 488, (Brewster Buffaloes, Hurricanes, Bristol Beaufighters and Mosquitoes); No. 489, (Bristol Blenheims, Bristol Beauforts, Handley Page Hampdens, Beaufighters and Mosquitoes); and No. 490, equipped with Consolidated Catalinas and Short Sunderlands.

=== RNZAF in the Pacific ===
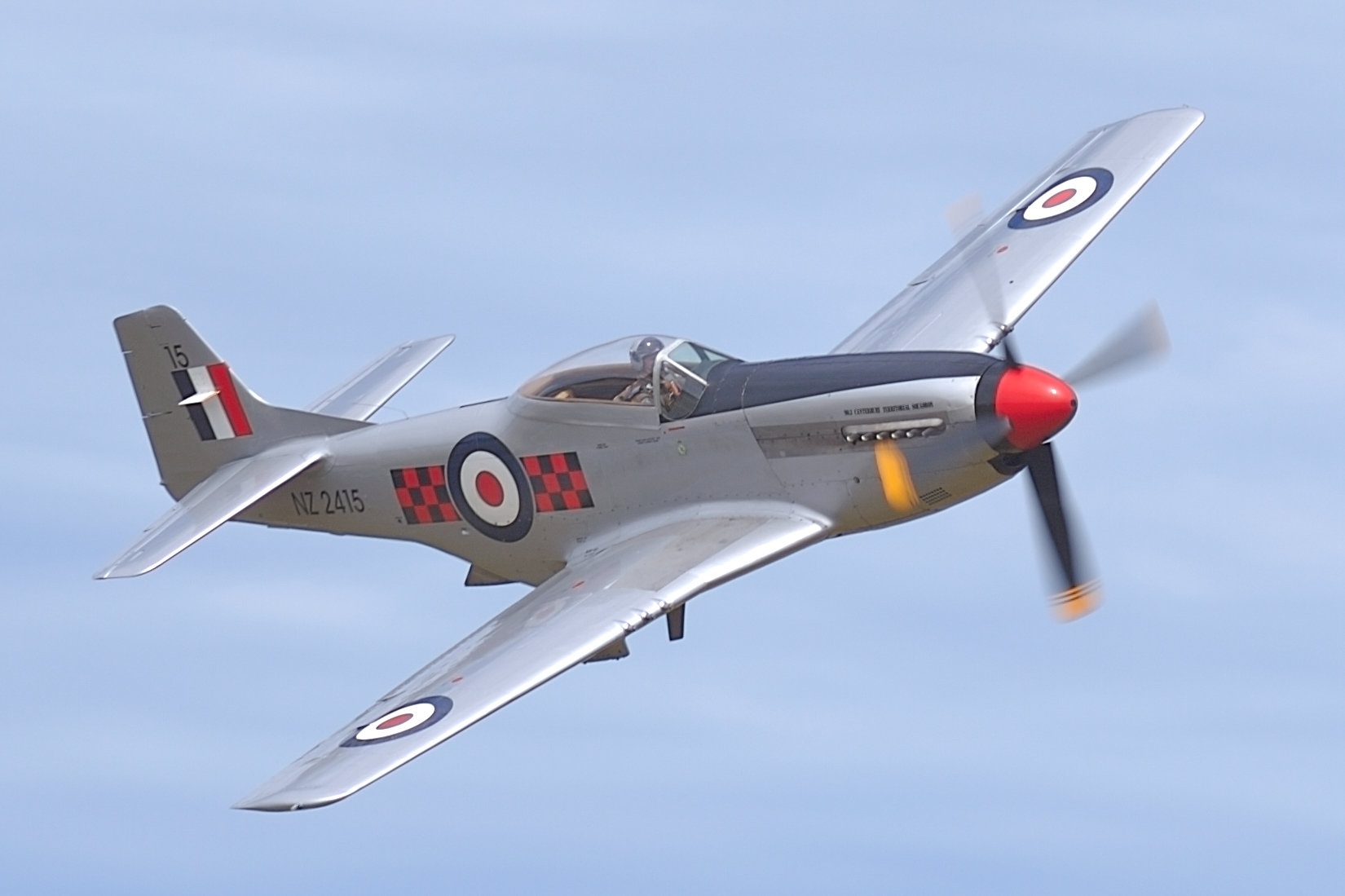
P-51D preserved in No. 3 (Canterbury) TAF colours

Lockheed Hudsons were obtained early in 1941 to take over this role. No. 5 Squadron with Vickers Vincents and Short Singapores was sent to protect Fiji. In December 1941 Japan attacked and rapidly conquered much of the area to the north of New Zealand. With the apparent threat of imminent invasion New Zealand was forced to look to her own defence, as well as to help the United Kingdom. Trainers and airliners in New Zealand were camouflaged and armed and various types, such as the North American Harvard, Hawker Hind, Airspeed Oxford and even the de Havilland Tiger Moth, formed shadow bomber, army co-operation and fighter squadrons for use in the event of invasion. Hudsons moved forward into the South Pacific while No. 5 Squadron, at RNZAF Station Laucala Bay in Fiji, commenced operations against the Japanese despite its obsolete equipment. In New Zealand, preparations intensified and in 1942 three Groups were established to direct air and, if necessary, air defence operations.

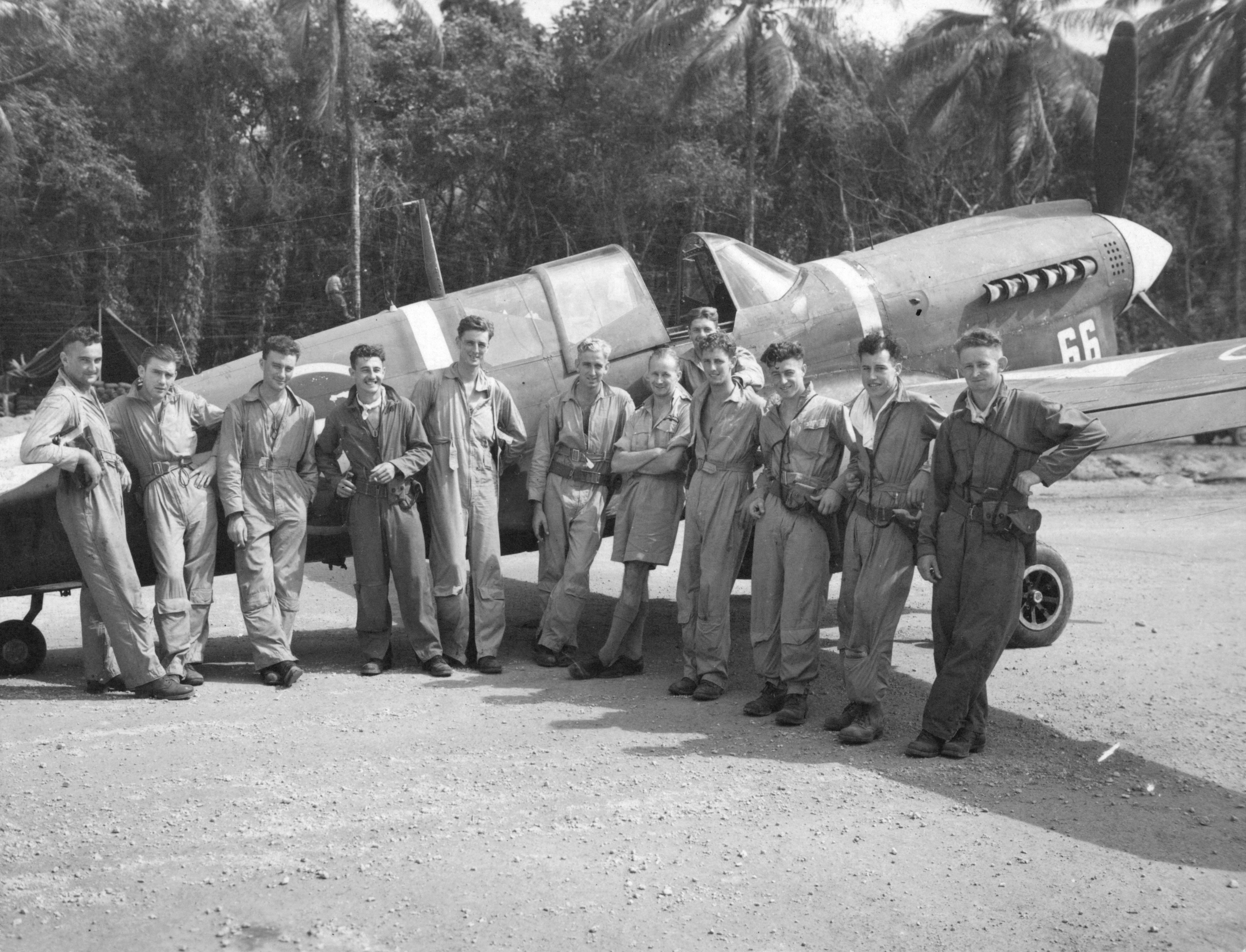
No. 17 Squadron RNZAF pilots at Ondonga on New Georgia, December 1943

The vulnerability of New Zealand to Axis naval activity was demonstrated when a submarine-launched Japanese float plane overflew Wellington and Auckland, where it was chased ineffectually by a Tiger Moth. Gradually at first, America was able to supply New Zealand with aircraft for use in the Pacific Theatre— initially, in 1942, Curtiss P-40 Kittyhawks and additional Harvards and Hudsons. The fall of Singapore led to some evacuated RNZAF pilots, that had been serving in the RAF there, becoming available in New Zealand. These men provided an experienced nucleus around which new fighter squadrons, the first being No. 14 Squadron RNZAF formed at Masterton, were established.

From mid-1943, at Guadalcanal, starting with No. 15 and No. 14 Squadrons, several RNZAF Kittyhawk units fought with distinction. Several pilots became aces against the Japanese, including Geoff Fisken, the Commonwealth's leading ace in the Pacific war. Other squadrons flew the elderly but effective Douglas Dauntless and, later, the modern Grumman Avenger torpedo bomber. From 12 October 1943, as part of Operation Cartwheel, RNZAF aircraft joined an allied air campaign against Japanese held airfields and the port of Rabaul.

The RNZAF took on a significant part of the maritime reconnaissance task with Catalina (and later Sunderland) flying boats and Hudson bombers.

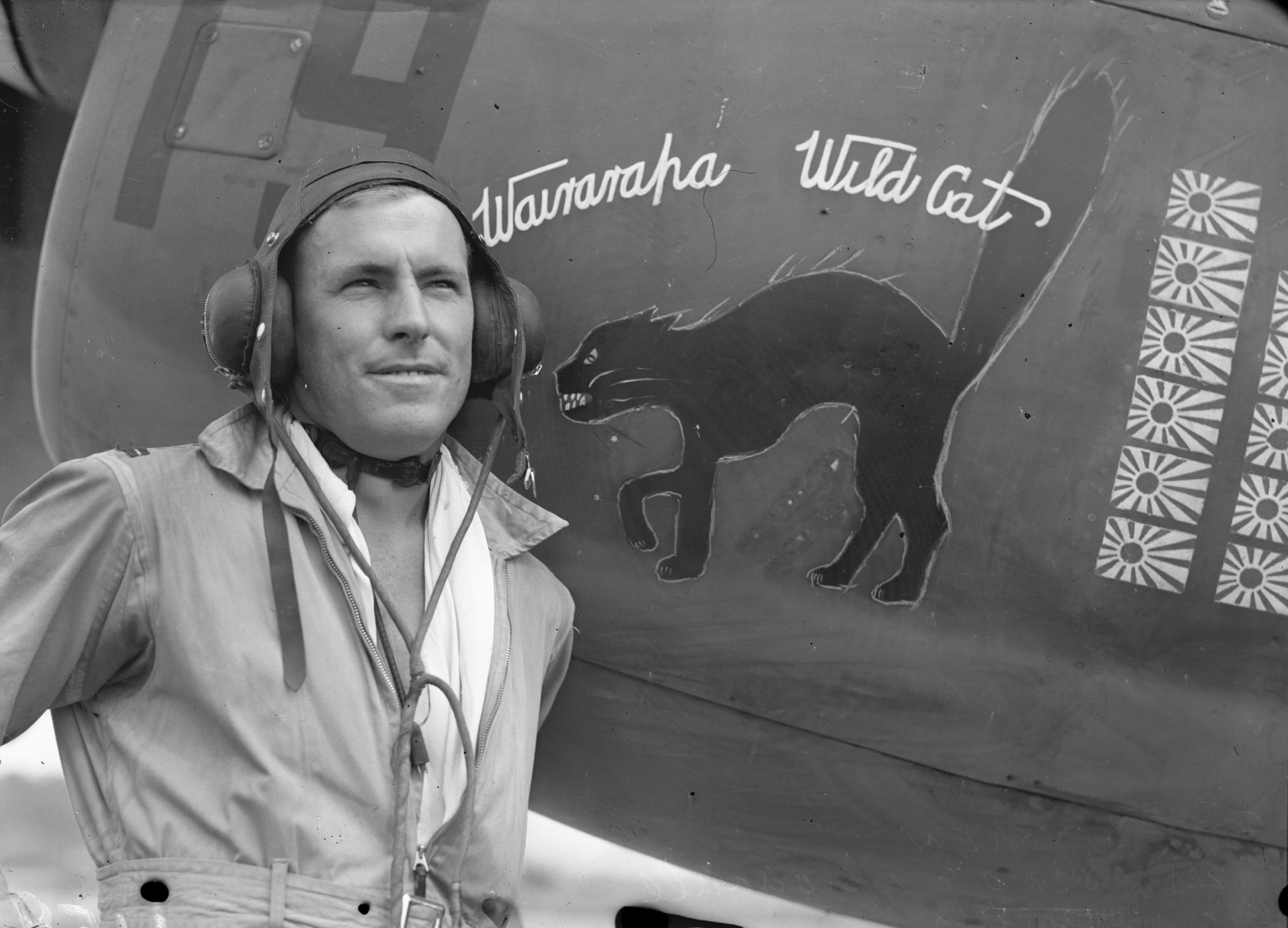
Geoff Fisken

The role of the RNZAF changed as the allies moved onto the offensive. The Americans, leaders of the Allied nations in the Pacific, planned to bypass major Japanese strongholds, instead capturing a handful of island bases to provide a supply chain for an eventual attack on Japan itself. The Allied advance started from the South Pacific. The RNZAF was part of the force tasked with securing the line of advance by incapacitating bypassed Japanese strongholds, for example, Rabaul.

As the war progressed the older types were replaced with more powerful modern aircraft; Kittyhawks gave way to Vought F4U Corsairs, while Hudsons were replaced by Venturas. At the close of war the RNZAF was planning to bring 320 North American P-51 Mustangs into service as part replacement for the F4U.

At its peak, in the Pacific, the RNZAF had 34 squadrons – 25 of which were based outside New Zealand and in action against Japanese forces. Thirteen of these squadrons were equipped with Corsairs, six with Venturas, two with Catalinas, two with Avengers and two with Douglas Dakota transport aircraft. The RNZAF also had a squadron of Dauntless dive bombers, several mixed transport and communications squadrons, a flight of Short Sunderlands and almost 1,000 training machines. To administer units in the South Pacific, No. 1 (Islands) Group RNZAF was formed, with Air Commodore Sidney Wallingford as its commander, on 10 March 1943. In addition to this, several hundred RNZAF personnel saw action with RAF squadrons or the FAA in Burma, Singapore and the South Pacific.

By 1945 the RNZAF had over 41,000 personnel, including just over 10,000 aircrew who served with the RAF in Europe and Africa.

=== Postwar RNZAF ===
In the post war period the RNZAF dealt progressively with demobilisation and disposal of its large obsolete fleet, rearmament to support the Cold War, some loss of training opportunities with the American suspension of ANZUS Treaty obligations in protest at New Zealand becoming a nuclear free zone, social changes which saw women become combat pilots, and the loss of combat capability.

Following the Second World War, No. 14 Squadron was sent to Japan as part of the occupation J Force. The rest of the air force rapidly divested itself of aircraft and manpower and settled mainly into training and transport mode before the advent of the rejuvenated No. 14 and No. 75 Squadrons.

From 1949, Compulsory Military Training reinvigorated the reserve component of the Air Force. The four Territorial squadrons, No. 1 Squadron RNZAF (Auckland), Wellington, Canterbury and No. 4 Squadron, Territorial Air Force, at Taieri Aerodrome, were equipped with the 30 Mustangs re-activated from storage, along with a few Tiger Moths and Harvards for each squadron. No. 4 Squadron TAF was active from at least 1951–55. From 1952 to 1957 No. 6 Flying Boat Squadron operated as a Territorial unit at Hobsonville, flying Catalinas and later Sunderlands.

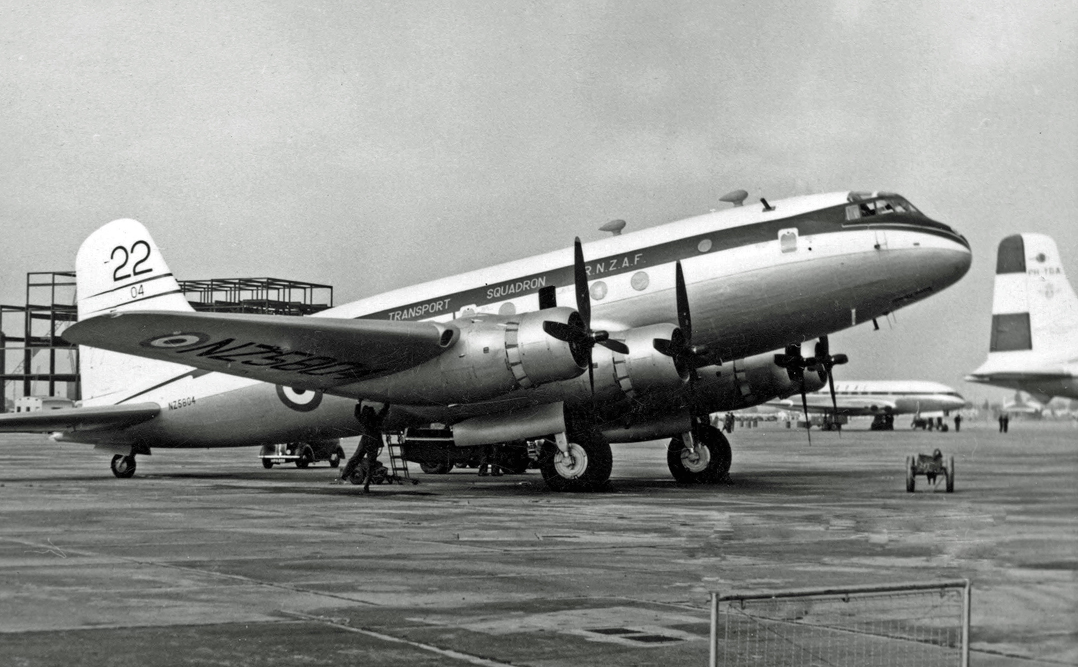
Hastings C.3 of 40 Squadron RNZAF in 1953

A Gloster Meteor arrived in 1945, introducing the jet age. The force was equipped from 1946 with the de Havilland Mosquito before the arrival of de Havilland Vampires. Initially used in peacekeeping in Cyprus and Singapore the Vampires were supplemented by loaned de Havilland Venoms and, later, English Electric Canberras, both of which saw action in the Malayan Emergency and subsequent confrontation with Indonesia. Internal communications and transport and other services were maintained by No. 42 Squadron RNZAF. It supported the Army and Navy using Grumman TBM-1 Avengers, the Territorial Air Force's North American P-51D Mustangs and North American Harvards, the VIPs with De Havilland Devons, also used for support, communications and multi-engine conversion training, and Douglas C-47, Douglas DC-6, and Handley Page Hastings for VIP and communications support. Nos. 5 and 6 Squadrons traded their lend-lease Catalinas for Short Sunderland MR5s operating in maritime patrol and search and rescue roles from Hobsonville and Laucala Bay, Fiji. 6 Squadron was disbanded while 5 Squadron received P-3B Orions in 1965.

A research flight helped develop Aerial Topdressing.

In 1957, the Territorial Air Force (TAF) was formally disbanded following a review of New Zealand's local defences.

=== Cold War ===
==== Malayan Emergency ====
The Malayan Emergency was declared by the British government on 18 June 1948 after several rubber plantation workers were killed in a revenge attack over the deaths of labour activists killed in police charges. This led to the creation of the Malayan National Liberation Army (MNLA), a communist guerrilla organisation. New Zealand's first contribution came in 1949, when C-47 Dakotas of RNZAF No. 41 Squadron were attached to the RAF's Far East Air Force. The C-47s were used to airdrop supplies to British and Malay forces fighting the MNLA, away from their usual station location in Hong Kong. By the time the aircraft were withdrawn in late 1951, 211 sorties had been carried out, dropping 284,000 kg of supplies.

==== Korean War ====
Although no RNZAF units were sent to Korea, a number of New Zealanders flew with other air forces in the conflict. Two men flew Gloster Meteor jets with No. 77 Squadron RAAF; one, Vance Drummond, was shot down and captured. A New Zealand Army artillery lieutenant was attached to a USAF tactical control unit as an observer in light aircraft. New Zealand born Alan Boxer, later a British air marshal, flew B-29 Superfortress missions on USAF attachment. One New Zealander flying in Korea as a lieutenant in the British Royal Navy from HMS Ocean, Cedric Macpherson, was killed on 11 February 1953 when his Hawker Sea Fury was shot down by ground fire. Five New Zealanders took part in Royal Australian Navy missions over Korea from the Australian carrier HMAS Sydney. Some of these pilots were former RNZAF members, others joining directly the British and Australian forces.

==== Far Eastern Strategic Reserve (FESR) ====
In 1955, the RNZAF established bases in Singapore and Malaysia. No. 41 Squadron moved to Changi, while No. 14 Squadron relocated to Tengah. These two squadrons represented New Zealand's air contributions to the newly created Far East Strategic Reserve.

On 1 May 1955, the air force carried out its first strike mission since the end of World War II, and its first with jet aircraft, using de Havilland Vampires of No. 14 Squadron. In 1955, the squadron was re-equipped with de Havilland Venoms and carried out 115 strike missions. The squadron was replaced in 1958 by No. 75 Squadron flying English Electric Canberras from their operational station in Tengah. In July 1955 No. 41 Squadron returned to Malaya and resumed supply dropping operations in support of anti-guerrilla forces, this time using the Bristol Freighter. Bristol Freighter serial NZ5901 crashed in the Cameron Highlands during supply drop operations on 10 December 1956. The aircraft flew into a valley and collided with a 4000-foot fog shrouded ridge. SQNLDR Alexander Tie, FLTOFF William Devescovi, FLTOFF Douglas Nelson and 5 passengers were killed, while a single passenger survived and was later rescued.

==== Antarctic Flight ====
The RNZAF Antarctic Flight was formed in 1956 to assist the Commonwealth Trans-Antarctic Expedition, equipped with an Auster Mk.7c purchased from the UK Air Ministry (NZ1707), De Havilland Canada DHC-3 Otter (NZ6081), and a De Havilland Canada DHC-2 Beaver (NZ6001, changed to NZ6010 to remove overlapping numbers with an RNZAF Gloster Meteor), with hardened and equipped with skis. It helped transport men, dog teams and supplies, and carried out geological mapping over the summers of 1956, 1957 and 1958 before disbanding in 1960. Operations in Antarctica resumed in 1965 when a Hercules flew the first of what have become annual summer flights from Christchurch to the continent. To the present day, the RNZAF operates both Boeing 757 and Lockheed C-130 Hercules to Phoenix Airfield.

==== Post-war modernisation ====
The Chief of Air Staff appointed in June 1962 was Air Vice-Marshal Ian G. Morrison, who was to oversee the modernisation of the RNZAF. Greener stated that Morrison '..saw the three elements of the Air Force—strike capability, transport, and maritime patrol—as being of equal value, and sought improvements in aircraft in each area. The following aircraft were purchased or put on order.

- Douglas A-4 Skyhawk – primary light attack/fighter aircraft
- Lockheed P-3 Orion – maritime patrol
- Lockheed C-130 Hercules – transport aircraft
- Bell 47 – training helicopter
- Bell UH-1 – utility helicopter
- Westland Wasp – naval-based helicopter

Morrison's modernisation programme saw the RNZAF switch primarily from British to American aircraft, reflecting the strategic alliances at the time. The arrival of the Bell 47 introduced the helicopter to the RNZAF.

==== Confrontation ====
In 1964 New Zealand began helping Malaysia to fight Indonesia's attempt to wrest control of the North Borneo territories in what was known as Confrontation. This role, which continued until 1966, saw New Zealand soldiers from 1RNZIR and NZ SAS mount covert cross-border raids into Indonesia. RNZAF flew continuous missions from the RAF base at Changi, Singapore resupplying the Commonwealth forces at the firebases and outposts located on the borders.

==== Vietnam War ====
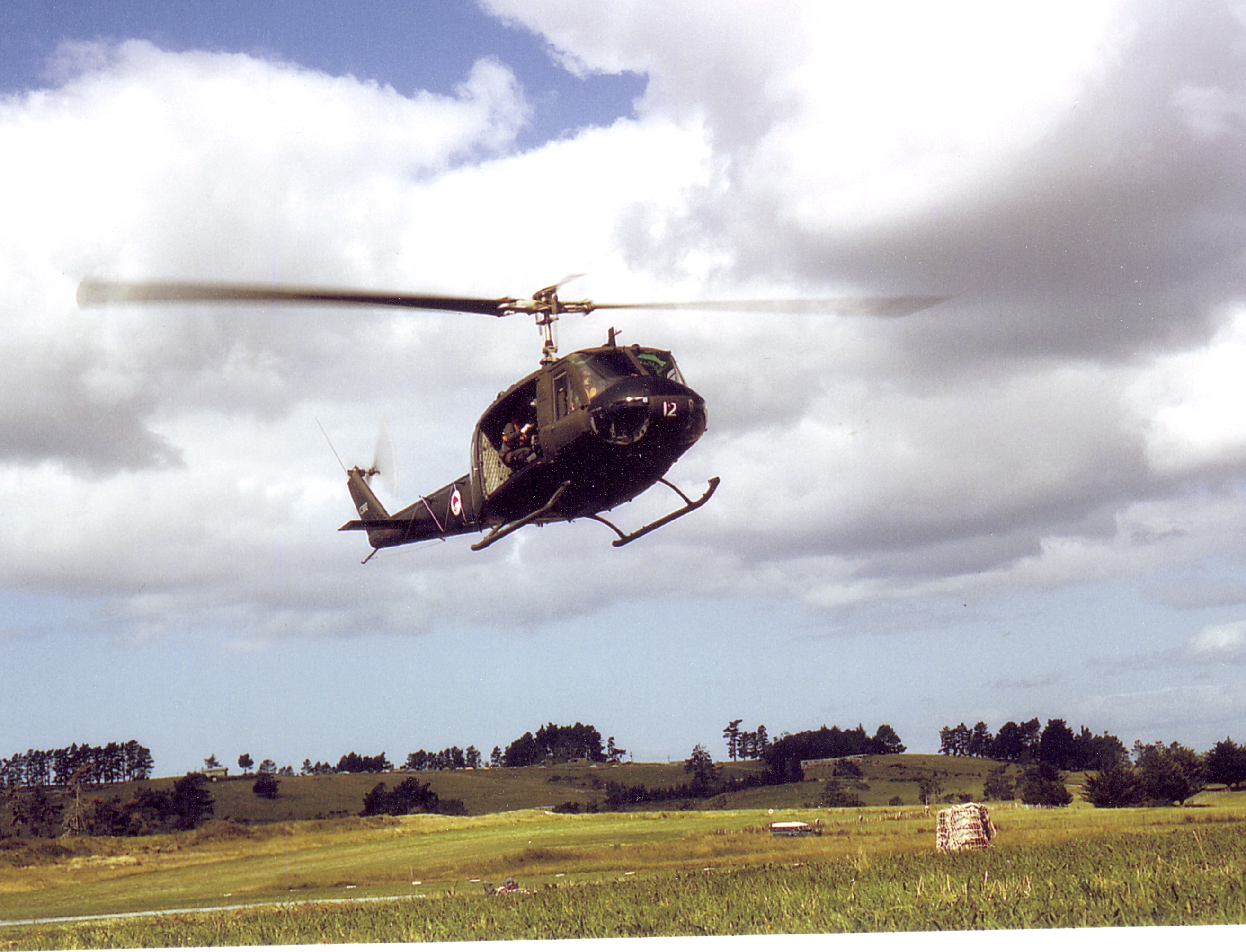
RNZAF UH-1H Huey

From 1962, the primary RNZAF contribution to the Vietnam War was No. 40 Squadron RNZAF and No. 41 Squadron RNZAF providing troop transport for military and non-military personnel and resupply runs. 40 Sqn flew from New Zealand or from the RAF base in Singapore, usually via Australia, to South Vietnam and elsewhere in South East Asia using Lockheed C-130 Hercules. 41 Sqn flew from Singapore to Hong Kong via South East Asia using Handley Page Hastings, Bristol Freighters. When the 1st Australian Task Force (1ATF) was established at Nui Dat an airfield was built to accommodate the RNZAF freighters so that personnel and supplies could be delivered more directly.

Canberra bombers were deployed in a non combat role, with crew observing American operations, and deploying to South Vietnam to conduct joint training with the USAF.

As 1ATF expanded, in June 1966, No. 9 Squadron RAAF had gone to South Vietnam and based itself at Vung Tau Air Base, equipped with Bell UH-1 Iroquois aircraft. Politically and operationally, it was advantageous for the RNZAF to assist the RAAF, who were facing a shortage of available pilots. In all, 16 RNZAF officers would serve in operational service in Vietnam with No. 9 Squadron RAAF. Flight Lieutenant Bill Waterhouse, the RNZAF's only Māori helicopter pilot at the time was killed in January 1969 flying an Iroquois in Canberra while preparing for service in South Vietnam.

The RNZAF additionally provided assistance in a Forward Air Control role in Vietnam flying with the USAF 20th Tactical Air Support Squadron at Da Nang Air Base, and USAF 19th Tactical Air Support Squadron at Bien Hoa Air Base with O-1, O-2 and OV-10 aircraft.

A small detachment of RNZAF ground crew from No. 75 Squadron RNZAF were also attached to a U.S Marine Corps VMA-311 A-4 Skyhawk unit at Chu Lai.

RNZAF personnel were numerous in the New Zealand Services Medical Team (NZSMT) and one went on to be part of the subsequent New Zealand Army Training Team (NZATTV.) RNZAF personnel were also posted to HQ V Force and worked primarily in Saigon in a range of liaison duties. One RNZAF member of the NZSMT, Sgt Gordon Watt, was killed by an improvised trap in 1970, the RNZAF's only casualty of the war. A memorial to Watt is on display at the Ohakea Base Medical flight, and there is also the "Gordon Watt Memorial Award" for the RNZAF's top medic award, named in his honour.

Flights to support the medical team at Qui Nhon and the New Zealand embassy in Saigon continued after the withdrawal of New Zealand ground forces in 1971.

In early April 1975 the squadron established a detachment at Tan Son Nhat International Airport near Saigon to evacuate New Zealand personnel from the country as North Vietnamese forces rapidly advanced. The last No. 41 Squadron flight out of the country departed on 21 April carrying 38 embassy staff (including the New Zealand Ambassador) and refugees, just prior to the fall of Saigon.

==== ANZUK and ANZUS co-operation ====
Following the end of the Vietnam War, the RNZAF adopted a stronger maritime focus. Long range surveillance patrols became more frequent in the waters around New Zealand as P-3 Orion crews and Navy Westland Wasp Helicopters hunted for Soviet and Chinese vessels in New Zealand's Exclusive Economic Zone. At the same time, aircrews adopted closer ties with the United States and Australia through the ANZUS alliance. The first overseas deployment of the new A-4 Skyhawks occurred in 1971 to RAAF Base Williamtown and HMAS Albatross in Australia. Skyhawk crews would be supported by Hercules, Andover, and later Boeing 727 aircraft to provide ground support crew and allow the setup of mobile TACAN stations. Additionally eight single seater Skyhawks were sent to Singapore to participate in Exercise Vanguard. Deployments occurred on a regular basis to Singapore, Malaysia and Indonesia.

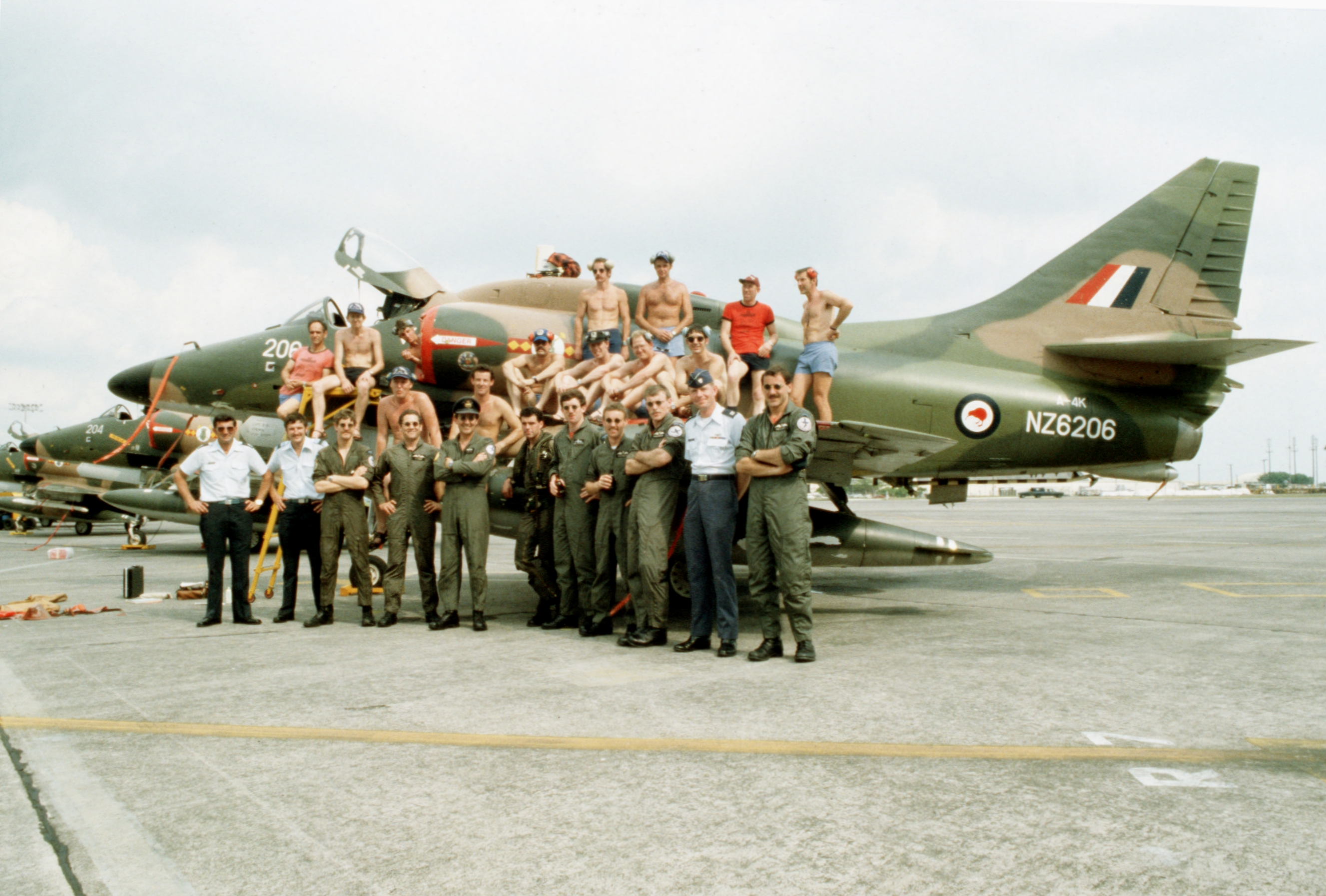
The A-4 Skyhawk NZ6206 involved in the Kin Nan Incident, is seen here at Clark Air Base, 1982.

No. 14 Squadron took up the role of advanced training. It briefly operated a small number (up to four) of two-seat A-4 Skyhawks and two-seat T.11 Vampires before re-equipping with 16 BAC Strikemaster light attack aircraft in 1972. Bristol Freighters, Douglas Dakotas and De Havilland Devons were replaced by Hawker Siddeley Andovers and second hand Fokker F-27 Frendships. Additionally, three Boeing 727 aircraft were purchased in 1981 for use as air transport. Cessna 421C Golden Eagle aircraft were also used for transport and VIP duties.

Another major change during this decade was the integration of the Women's Auxiliary Air Force into the Air Force in 1977, removing most restrictions on their employment and career opportunities, with the exception of some aircrew branches.

Throughout the 1970s, RNZAF Ohakea would also see significant visits from the RAF, USAF and RAAF. The RNZAF additionally participated in a number of ANZUS joint exercises in this period.

The Kin Nan Incident occurred in March 1976. The Kin Nan was a Taiwanese squid fishing boat operating illegally within New Zealand waters. Following a failure to reply to warning shots and messages from two RNZN Patrol boats, several Skyhawks were sent to intercept the ship, armed with Zuni rockets and 20mm rounds. A Skyhawk operated by Jim Jennings (NZ6206) fired a 53-round burst at the boat, causing it to stop and allow the Navy to board it. The Skyhawk involved is preserved at the Museum of Transport & Technology in Auckland.

==== Fourth Labour Government, anti-nuclear legislation and ANZUS split ====
Following the end of the US friendly Muldoon government, and the subsequent election of David Lange and the Fourth Labour Government, the RNZAF severed overt military ties with the United States and United Kingdom, with the New Zealand military reoriented towards more globalist and international roles such as United Nations peacekeeping. Under the New Zealand Nuclear Free Zone, Disarmament, and Arms Control Act 1987, territorial sea, land and airspace of New Zealand became nuclear-free zones. This had a dramatic effect on the efficiencies of the Air Force's combat squadrons. With the lack of opportunities to practice operations skills, it became extremely difficult to maintain pace with the Air Forces New Zealand had traditionally worked with. By the late 1980s, the RNZAF held an active role in United Nations operations in the Sinai Peninsula and Iran. This time period also saw the end of involvement in Singapore. No. 1 Squadron was deactivated in December 1984, and its Andovers were transferred to No. 42 Squadron.

Project Kahu

By the 1980s, the Skyhawks were reaching the end of their effective use. A comprehensive upgrade to the Skyhawk began, along with the purchase of used A-4G Skyhawks from the Royal Australian Navy. The Skyhawk upgrade included a new radar, HOTAS controls, glass cockpit with HUD and new inertial navigation system. The aircraft also received armament upgrades including the capability to fire AIM-9L Sidewinders, AGM-65 Mavericks and GBU-16 Paveway II laser-guided bombs. The cost of the project was NZ$140 million and gave the RNZAF Skyhawks the electronic "eyes and ears" of a modern fighter aircraft such as the F-16 Fighting Falcon or F/A-18 Hornet. To complement these upgrades, 18 new Aermacchi MB-339 were introduced as an advanced jet trainer, replacing the BAC Strikemaster.

=== Post-Cold War ===
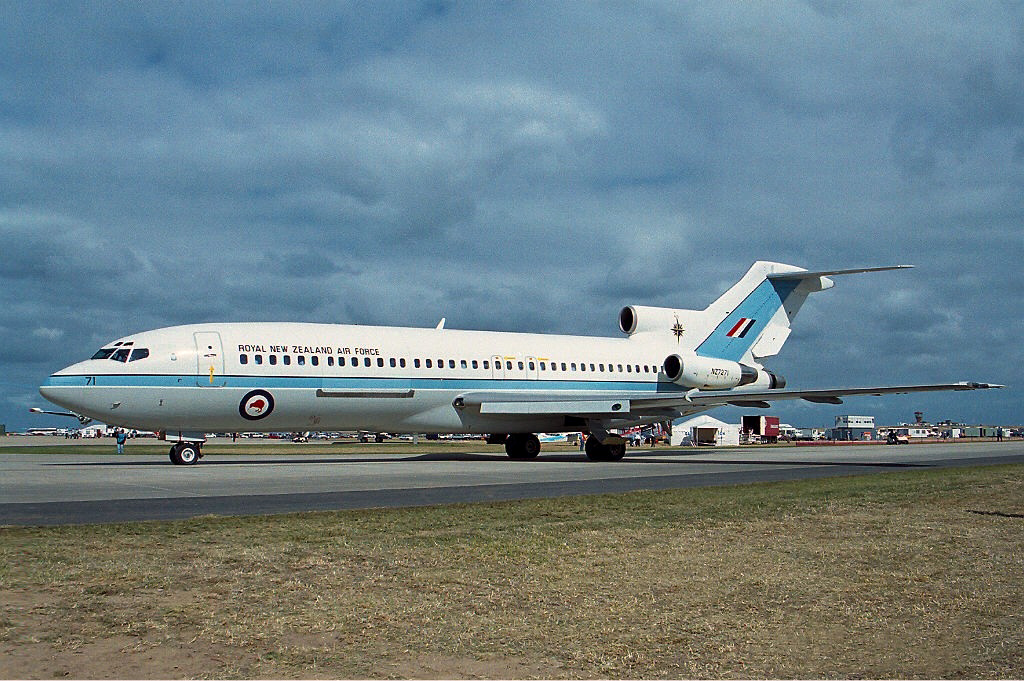
RNZAF Boeing 727 in 2001.

The 50th anniversary of the RNZAF was celebrated with a gold painted Skyhawk and large-scale formations with Skyhawks and Strikemasters. An airshow at RNZAF Ohakea was held, with visiting aircraft from the RAF and RAAF.

In February 1991 No. 2 Squadron was reformed, then relocated to HMAS Albatross in Australia with the updated Kahu Skyhawks to provide the Australian Defence Force (ADF), particularly the Royal Australian Navy, with Air Defence Support, participating in exercises with RAN warships. The squadron was equipped with two A-4K and four TA-4K aircraft supported by 50 to 60 personnel. No. 2 Squadron continued to provide air defence training to the ADF until November 2001.

The end of the Cold War saw dramatic changes in the composition of the RNZAF. With government policies from the Fourth Labour Government urging to reduce public spending, the RNZAF began to consolidate its facilities, led by Minister of Defence Bob Tizard. The Air Force Stores Depot at Te Rapa was closed in 1992, with redevelopment into The Base Shopping Centre. On 14 September 1995, the closing parade was held for the first RNZAF airfield, RNZAF Station Wigram in Christchurch. The support base RNZAF Shelly Bay, located on Wellington's Miramar peninsula, also closed. The helicopter and former seaplane base RNZAF Hobsonville was sold to Housing New Zealand, and is being redeveloped as a residential area by the Hobsonville Land Company. Both Wigram and Hobsonville have been redeveloped into housing areas, while Shelly Bay remains abandoned. Following the neoliberal ideology of the 1990s, non-core activities such as maintenance and food catering have been privatised and contracted out. Despite the reduction in budget and manpower, international deployments by the Air Force were expanded. During the Gulf War, two Hercules and personnel of No. 40 Squadron were deployed to the Gulf War, where they operated as part of a RAF Hercules Squadron. No. 2 Squadron continued service at Nowra, Australia, providing training for the Royal Australian Navy and conversion for RNZAF Skyhawk pilots. No. 42 Squadron spent five months deployed in Somalia, with three Andover transport planes. Humanitarian airlifts were conducted by Hercules and Boeing aircraft of No. 40 Squadron in the Middle East and Rwanda. No. 40 Squadron also provided air transport support to the NZ Army contingent in Bosnia.

The RNZAF had a sizeable involvement in the Bougainville conflict, involving C-130 transport aircraft UH-1 Iroquois, and Westland Wasp helicopters. Aircraft also supported several UN missions such as UNTAET while carrying out peacetime tasks for governmental and civilian purposes.

Westland Wasp helicopters were replaced with Kaman SH-2 Seasprite helicopters, awaiting further orders of SH-2G Super Seasprites.

=== 21st century ===
==== Air combat force disbandment ====
In 1999, the National Government selected an order of 28 F-16A/B aircraft to replace the fleet of A-4 Skyhawks but this procurement was cancelled in 2001 following election by the incoming Labour Government under Helen Clark. This was followed by the disbanding of No. 2 and No. 75 Skyhawk squadrons and No. 14 Aermacchi squadron, removing the RNZAF's air combat capability. Subsequently, most of the RNZAF's fighter pilots left New Zealand to serve in the RAAF and the RAF. By 2003 the RNZAF was reduced to a total of 53 aircraft and 2,523 personnel (including civilian employees).

In 2005 the Ministry of Defence selected the NH90 helicopter to replace the RNZAF's ageing fleet of 14 UH-1H Iroquois. The NZ government allocated NZ$550 million to replace the Iroquois and Bell 47 (Sioux) training helicopters. In November 2011, a private defence contractor in the United States, Draken International, purchased eight of the stored RNZAF A-4K Skyhawks and nine of the Aermacchi MB-339s. The aircraft are utilised for commercial air services as an adversary squadron.

New Zealand took an option to purchase C-130J Hercules from Lockheed Martin as a part of an Australian purchase in the late 1990s but following the 1999 election the new Labour government decided not to proceed with the purchase. Instead a NZD$226m service life extension programme (LEP) was arranged with L3 Spar Aerospace of Canada in 2004. The LEP will see the C-130 Hercules with the most flying hours in the world remain in use until about 2025.

Since 2001, RNZAF P-3K Orions and C-130 Hercules have made periodic deployments in support of Operation Enduring Freedom and the International Security Assistance Force in Afghanistan.

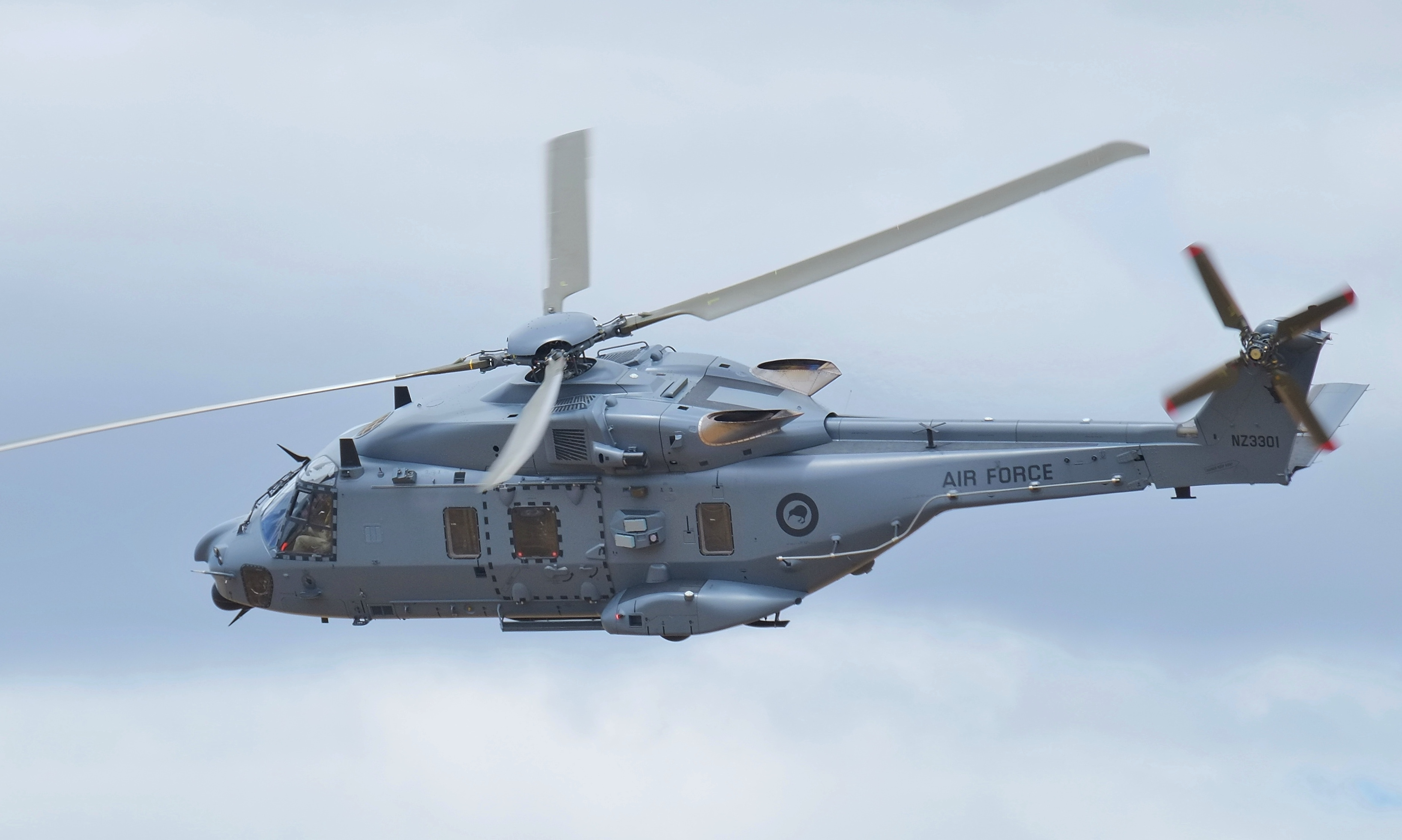
RNZAF NH90

The Naval Support Flight was separated from 3 Squadron to re-form 6 Squadron in October 2005. In October 2007 the government announced it had selected the Agusta A109 as the preferred replacement for the Sioux helicopters. Chief of Air Force, Air Vice-Marshal Graham Lintott, said the A109 "will provide an effective platform to train aircrew in basic helicopter operations plus the advanced skills required to operate both the SH-2 Seasprite and the NH90 helicopter that will come into service in 2010."

In 2008 the Defence Minister expressed the desire to return to service all 17 Aermacchi trainers to supplement Army and Navy operations. Prime Minister John Key said at the time that it was extremely unlikely that any jet training would be restored in 2010.

==== Humanitarian activities ====
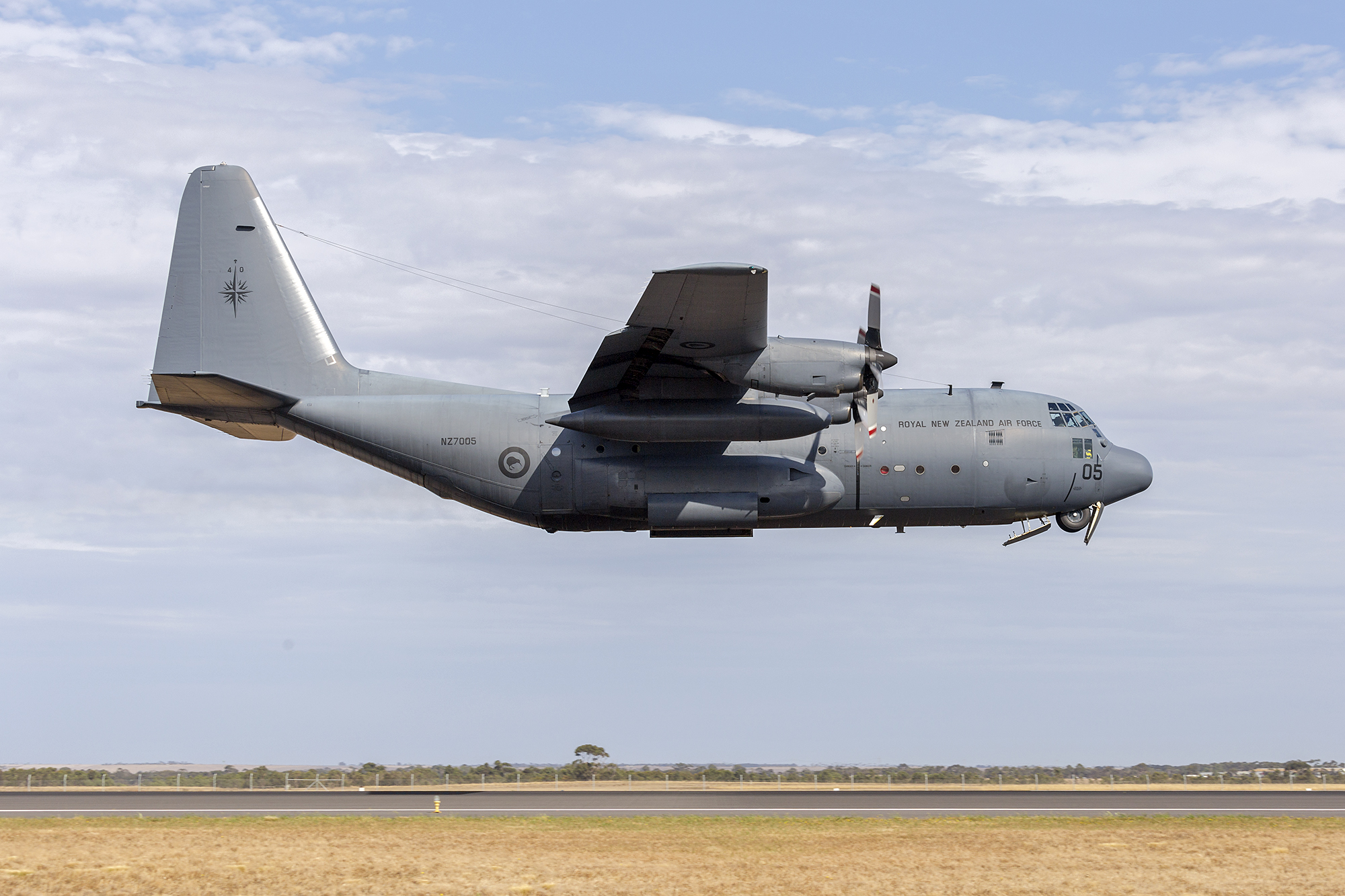
RNZAF C-130H Hercules of No. 40 Squadron

In recent years the RNZAF has been involved in a number of domestic incidents, especially natural disasters that have hit the region.

- Following the 2009 Samoa earthquake and tsunami the RNZAF deployed several P-3 Orions initially to assess the damage and search for bodies in the immediate aftermath of the incident. The day after the tsunami a C-130 Hercules carrying mobile morgues, medical staff and supplies to the area helped with recovery efforts. Following this the RNZAF worked closely with the RAAF, the US Navy and USAF to provide airlifts and supply drops for several weeks after the disaster. RNZAF also provided assistance on the ground in both Samoa and Tonga. The RNZAF and Air New Zealand also arranged for the evacuation of all tourists from Samoa to Auckland.
- In the aftermath of the 2010 Canterbury earthquake on 4 September 2010 a C-130 Hercules transported Search and Rescue Teams from Whenuapai Air Base to Christchurch that morning to aid in relief efforts. This was followed later in the afternoon by the deployment from Ohakea Air Base of two Iroquois Helicopters which provided aerial reconnaissance and damage assessments. Due to disrupted supplies at Christchurch Airport an RNZAF fuel tanker was also despatched from Ohakea Air Base to supply these aircraft.
- Responding to the February 2011 Christchurch earthquake the RNZAF deployed three C-130 Hercules, two Boeing 757s, a P-3 Orion, three Beechcraft B200 aircraft and three Bell UH-1H helicopters to assist the people of Christchurch. The aircraft flew around the clock to deploy police and medical personnel. C-130s and B757s also acted as aero-medical aircraft and evacuated victims and tourists to Wellington and Auckland. This was the single biggest movement of personnel and freight by the RNZAF in its history. C-130s from the RAAF and RSAF were also deployed to the area and worked in conjunction with the RNZAF.
- In December 2011 the Russian fishing vessel Sparta struck an iceberg in the Ross Sea, RNZAF C-130s made two flights from New Zealand to McMurdo Station in Antarctica, air-dropping supplies to the crew en route.
- In 2013 the RNZAF sent one C-130 Hercules to the Philippines after a hurricane for disaster relief and evacuation of locals.
- Following the disappearance of Malaysian Airlines flight MH-370 in March 2014, an RNZAF P-3K2 Orion was deployed to RAAF Base Butterworth to assist with the search for the Boeing 777. The Orion aircraft and crew was then re-tasked and conducted their operations from RAAF Base Pearce near Perth, Western Australia, searching the Southern Indian Ocean for MH-370 alongside other international aircraft and crews.
- To safeguard trade routes from the threat of piracy, a P-3K2 Orion was deployed to the Middle East from July 2014 until December 2015. The Orion conducted anti-piracy and maritime surveillance activities in support of the Combined Maritime Forces coalition in the region.
- Responding to Cyclone Winston that devastated Fiji in February 2016 the RNZAF deployed a P-3 Orion, C-130 Hercules and Boeing 757, and two NH90s aboard HMNZS Canterbury. Specialist NZ Fire Service teams and NZ Army engineers flew to Fiji in the Boeing 757.
- In response to the 2016 Kaikōura earthquake the magnitude 7.8 earthquake devastated North Canterbury and Kaikōura. The RNZAF deployed four NH90 helicopters, C-130 Hercules, and a P-3K2 Orion for survey damage. The RNZAF NH90s were tasked with evacuating over 1000 tourists and transporting food and supplies to the town of Kaikōura and surrounding areas. The US Navy and Royal Malaysian Air Force also offered helicopters to assist with the evacuation of tourists and transportation of rescue personnel. Nearly 200 people had been airlifted out of Kaikōura by late evening on 15 November, with about 1,000 still to be evacuated on the following morning.
- Following the Fall of Kabul on 15 August 2021, the New Zealand Government dispatched a single C-130 Hercules (NZ7005) with a contingent of troops to assist in the evacuation of New Zealand citizens and Afghans who had aided the NZDF from Kabul's Hamid Karzai International Airport. On 26 August, the RNZAF suspended its evacuation flights following the 2021 Kabul airport attacks. By 28 August, the NZDF had evacuated 370 people from Afghanistan to the United Arab Emirates, awaiting further transportation.
- Between 5 and 6 August 2025, an RNZAF C-130J Hercules evacuated three personnel of the United States National Science Foundation from McMurdo Station. The mission occurred during frigid and dark mid-winter conditions. The United States Embassy's Chargé d'Affaires Melissa Sweeney thanked the RNZAF for evacuating the three Americans, who received medical treatment in Christchurch.

==== 2025–2028 defence investments ====
On 21 August 2025, Defence Minister Collins and Foreign Minister Peters announced that the Government would replace the RNZAF's two Boeing 757s with two new Airbus A321XLRs, expected to be delivered in 2028. These aircraft have a range of up to 8,700 km and would be acquired under a six-year lease-to-buy arrangement worth NZ$700 million. In 2025 it was reported that the Airbus jets would be used for transporting military personnel, equipment, humanitarian aid, evacuating civilians, and ferrying government and diplomatic delegations. That same day, an USAF C-5M Super Galaxy delivered components for a C-130J Hercules simulator to RNZAF Base Auckland. These flight simulators allows Hercules pilots to train in New Zealand instead of travelling to the United States.

In August 2025, the New Zealand Government announced plans to spend NZ$2.7 billion on purchasing five MH-60R Seahawk helicopters and two Airbus A321XLR planes. In early June 2026, the United States Department of State authorised the sale of five MH-60R Seahawk helicopters and related Mark 54 lightweight torpedoes to New Zealand, subject to approval from the United States Congress. On 20 October 2026, the NZ Government signed a $1.6 billion deal to acquire the five Seahawk helicopters and associated torpedoes and missiles.

== Active bases and facilities ==
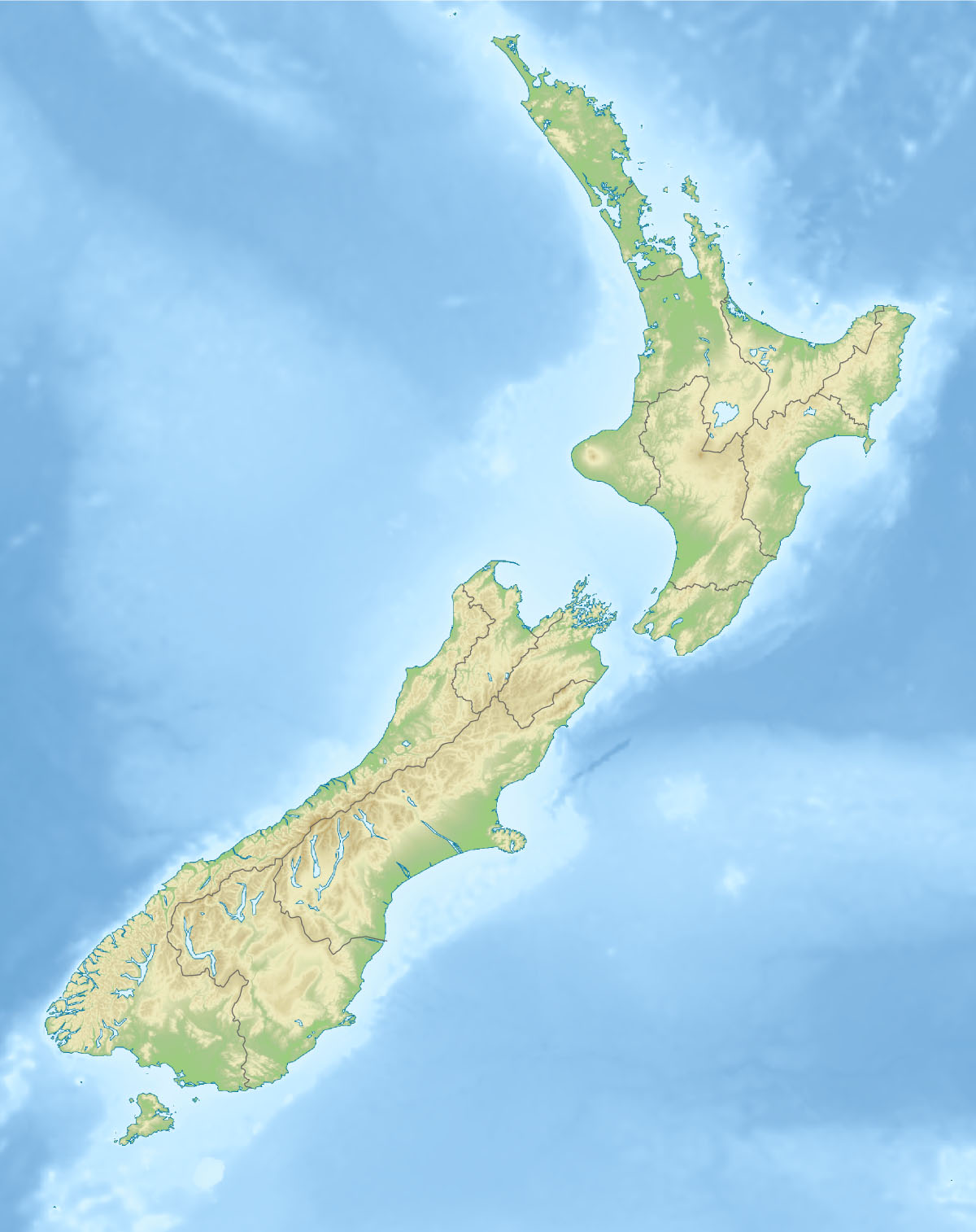
RNZAF Air Bases

=== Air bases ===
- RNZAF Base Auckland, Auckland.
- RNZAF Base Ohakea, Bulls, Manawatū.
- RNZAF Base Woodbourne, Blenheim, Marlborough.

=== Support facilities ===
- Air Movements Rongotai, Wellington International Airport, Wellington.
- Air Movements Harewood, Christchurch International Airport, Christchurch.

=== Training areas ===
- Kaipara Bombing Range, Kaipara, Auckland.
- Raumai Bombing Range, Ohakea, Manawatū.
- RNZAF Dip Flat, Nelson Lakes.

=== Museums ===
- Air Force Museum of New Zealand, Wigram, Christchurch.

== Structure ==
The RNZAF's force operates in conjunction with the rest of the New Zealand Defence Force. The chain of command runs from Defence Force headquarters in central Wellington to Headquarters Joint Forces New Zealand (HQ JFNZ) at Trentham in Upper Hutt. Under the Commander Joint Forces New Zealand (a rear admiral, air vice-marshal, or major general, depending on rotation) is the Air Component Commander, an Air Commodore. The RNZAF is divided into three commands:

=== Air Component Command ===
Responsible for command, training and generation of all flying training and all Air Force organisations, assigned to enable New Zealand's following capabilities:

- Air Surveillance and Response
- Naval Air Support
- Strategic, theatre and tactical air mobility capability.

RNZAF Base Auckland

- No. 6 Squadron – SH-2 Super Seasprite
- No. 40 Squadron – C-130J Super Hercules, Boeing 757
- No. 62 Squadron – Space Operations (Monitoring, analysing and understanding space activity)
- No. 230 Squadron– Mission Support (Headquarters for intelligence and computer and information systems)
- Aviation Medicine Unit
- Parachute Training Support Unit
- Survival Training Centre (SERE)
- Military Working Dog Training School
- Base Medical Flight
- RNZAF Security Forces
- RNZAF Police
- Base Operations Squadron Auckland

RNZAF Base Ohakea

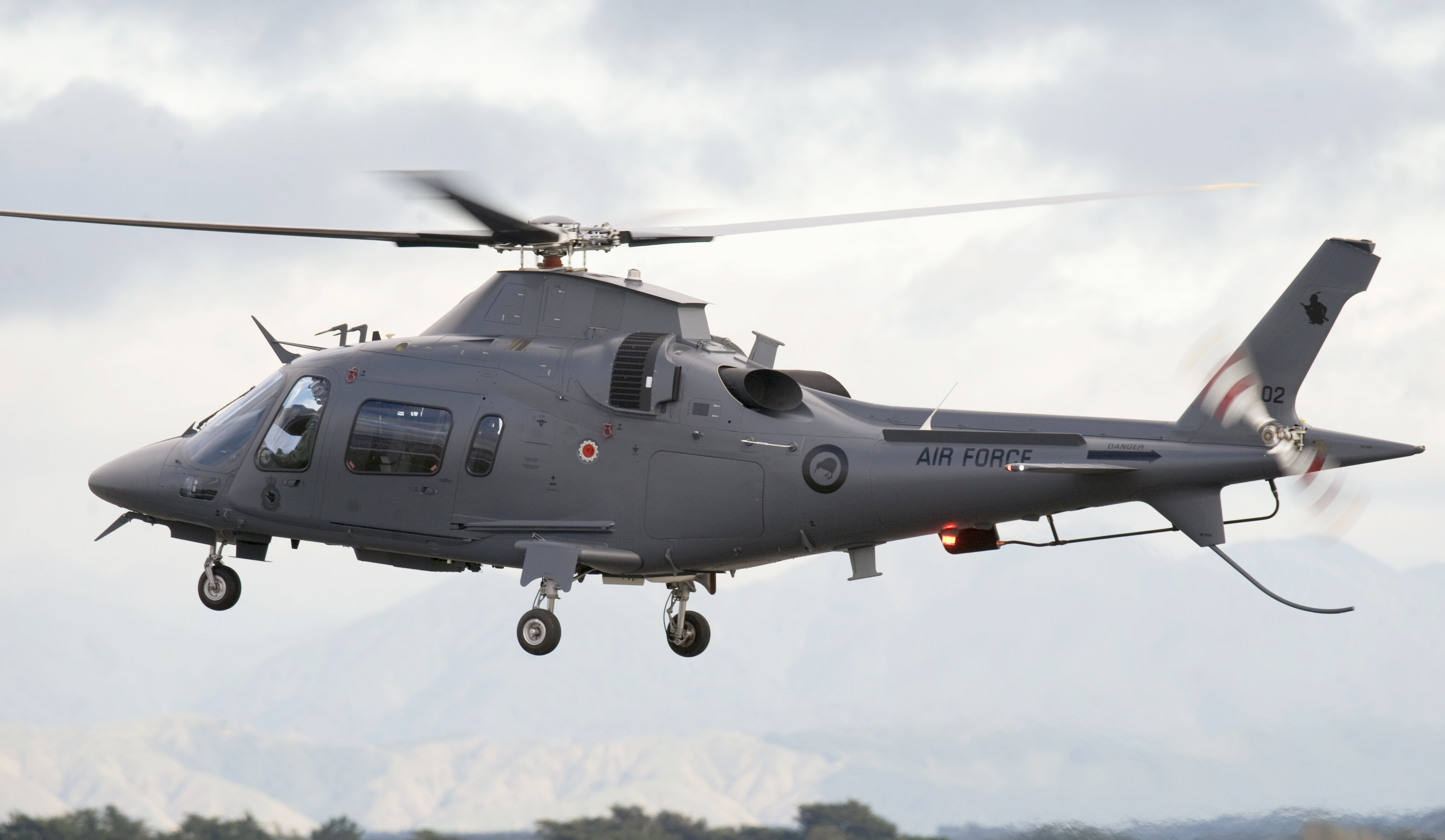
An AW109 lifts off from RNZAF Base Ohakea

- No. 3 Squadron – NH90, AW109
- No. 5 Squadron – P-8 Poseidon
- No. 14 Squadron – T-6 Texan II
- No. 42 Squadron – King Air 350
- Central Flying School – T-6 Texan II
- Air Force Heritage Flight of New Zealand
- Base Medical Flight
- RNZAF Security Forces
- RNZAF Police
- Base Operations Squadron Ohakea

=== Air Staff ===
Provides advice and staff support to the Chief of Air Force, enabling them to command the RNZAF, and fulfil prescribed responsibilities to the Chief of Defence Force for the implementation of approved policy and plans. Air Staff comprises

- Office of Strategy Management
- Training and Support
- Directorate of Air Force Safety and Health
- Directorate of Career Management
- Directorate of Engineering and Technical Airworthiness
- Air Force Museum of New Zealand

RNZAF Base Woodbourne

- Command Training School
- Command and Recruit Training Squadron
- Technical Training Squadron
- Mission Support Training Squadron
- Base Operations Squadron Woodbourne
- Directorate of Defence Security
- NZDF Physical Instructors Training School
- Airbus Aircraft Facility (Heavy maintenance facility for the repair of aircraft airframes, engines and avionics systems)
- Nelson Marlborough Institute of Technology Aeronautical Engineering programme

=== Logistics Command ===
Defence Logistics Command personnel are spread across the three air force bases. They provide a range of services needed to sustain aircraft on deployment. Defence Logistics Command is organised into the following areas:

- Quality Management Office
- Material Support Wings
- Maintenance Wings
- Business Support Units

== Equipment ==
=== Current inventory ===
Aircraft	Origin	Type	Variant	In service	Notes
Maritime patrol
Boeing P-8	United States	ASW / Patrol	P-8A	4	Aircraft delivered in 2023.
Transport
Boeing 757	United States	Transport	757-2K2	2	Due to be replaced in 2028 with two Airbus A321XLRs.
C-130J Super Hercules	United States	Tactical airlifter	C-130J-30	5	Aircraft delivered in 2024.
Helicopters
NHIndustries NH90	France / Italy	Transport / Utility	NH90 TTH	8	Aircraft delivered in 2014.
AgustaWestland AW109	Italy	Light utility	A109LUH	5	Aircraft delivered in 2011.
SH-2G Super Seasprite	United States	ASW / Patrol	SH-2G(I)	5	Due to be replaced in 2027 with five MH-60R Seahawks.
Trainer aircraft
T-6 Texan II	United States	Trainer	T-6C	11	Aircraft delivered in 2015.
Super King Air	United States	Multi-engine trainer / Patrol	KA350	4	Delivered in mid-2020. Two modified for maritime surveillance as well as training.

=== Future inventory ===
Aircraft	Origin	Type	Expected	On order	Notes
Helicopters
MH-60R Seahawk	United States	ASW / Patrol	2027	5	Replacement for SH-2G Super Seasprites.
Transport
Airbus A321XLR	France	Transport	2028	2	Replacement for Boeing 757s.

=== Retired equipment ===
Among previous aircraft operated were A-4K Skyhawk, P-3K Orion, MB-339CB Aermacchi, BAC Strikemaster, CT-4 Airtrainer, C-130H Hercules, Bell UH-1H, Boeing 727, Westland Wasp and Bell 47G.

== Display teams ==
=== Black Falcons ===
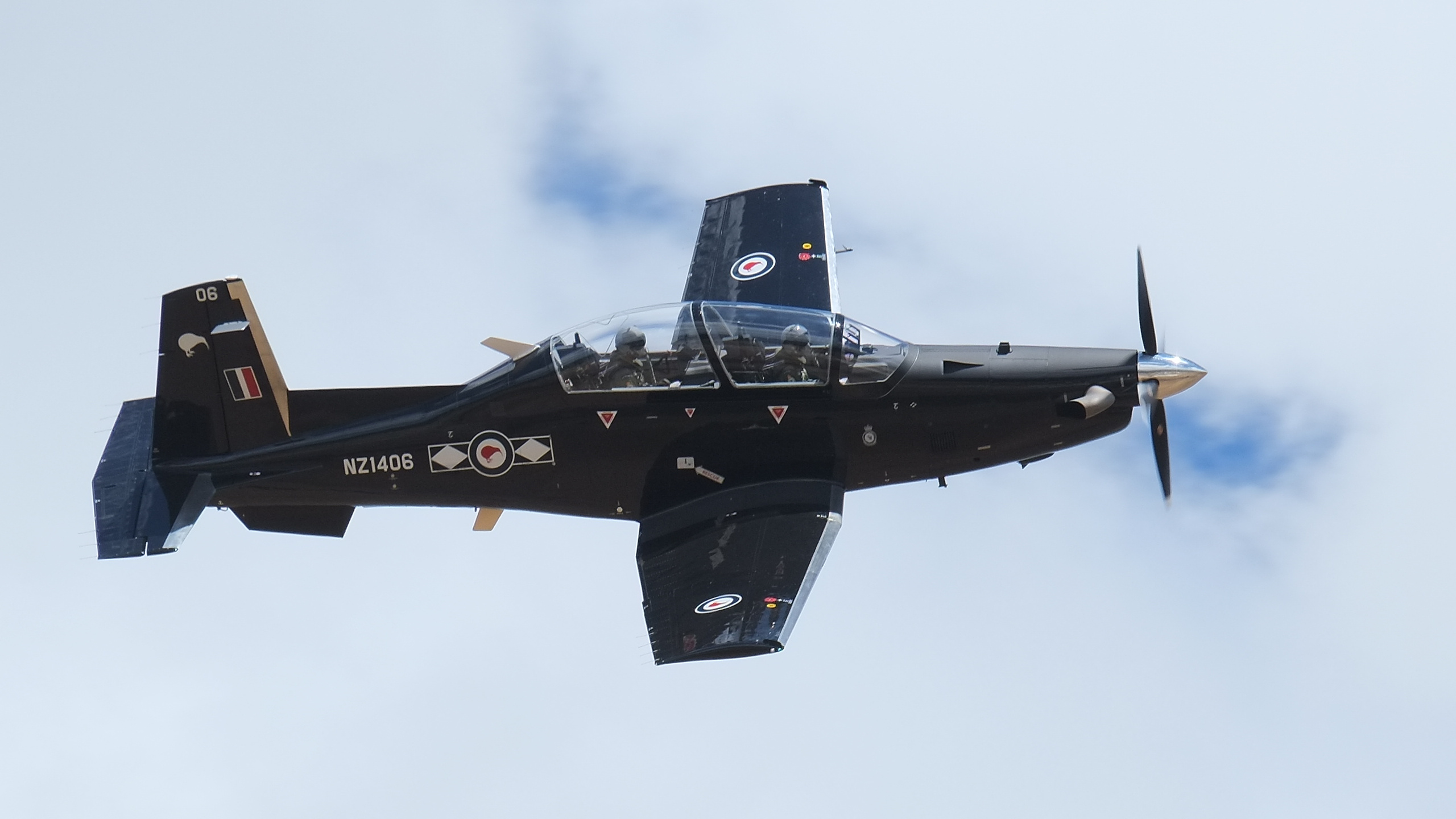
RNZAF T-6C Texan II of No. 14 Squadron

The Black Falcons are the current aerobatic display team of the Royal New Zealand Air Force, replacing their predecessor "The Red Checkers". They fly the Beechcraft T-6 Texan II.

In January 2016, the Central Flying School (CFS) began flying 11 T-6 Texan II, sharing the aircraft with No. 14 Squadron. The team is made up of Qualified Flying Instructors of the Central Flying School and No.14 Squadron. The bulk of the team generally come from CFS, with the Team Leader (Falcon 1) normally also holding the post of Officer Commanding Central Flying School. The new team's first display was scheduled for the 2017 Wings over Wairarapa airshow, but bad weather caused the displays to be cancelled. Instead, the first display was held at the RNZAF 80th Anniversary Air Tattoo at the team's home base, RNZAF Base Ohakea, the following week.

=== Air Force Heritage Flight ===
The Air Force Heritage Flight of New Zealand is a collaborative partnership between the RNZAF and a number of civil organisations created in 2022. Its purpose is to operate heritage aircraft that are relevant to the history and traditions of the air force. Replacing the RNZAF Historic Flight, the air force provides pilots to fly a number of aircraft for the purposes of conducting flypasts and displays around New Zealand.

=== Previous display teams ===
- RNZAF Historic Flight
- Red Checkers
- Kiwi Red
- RAGNSBQGAT
- Jetobatics
- Yellow Hammers

== Symbols, flags and emblems ==
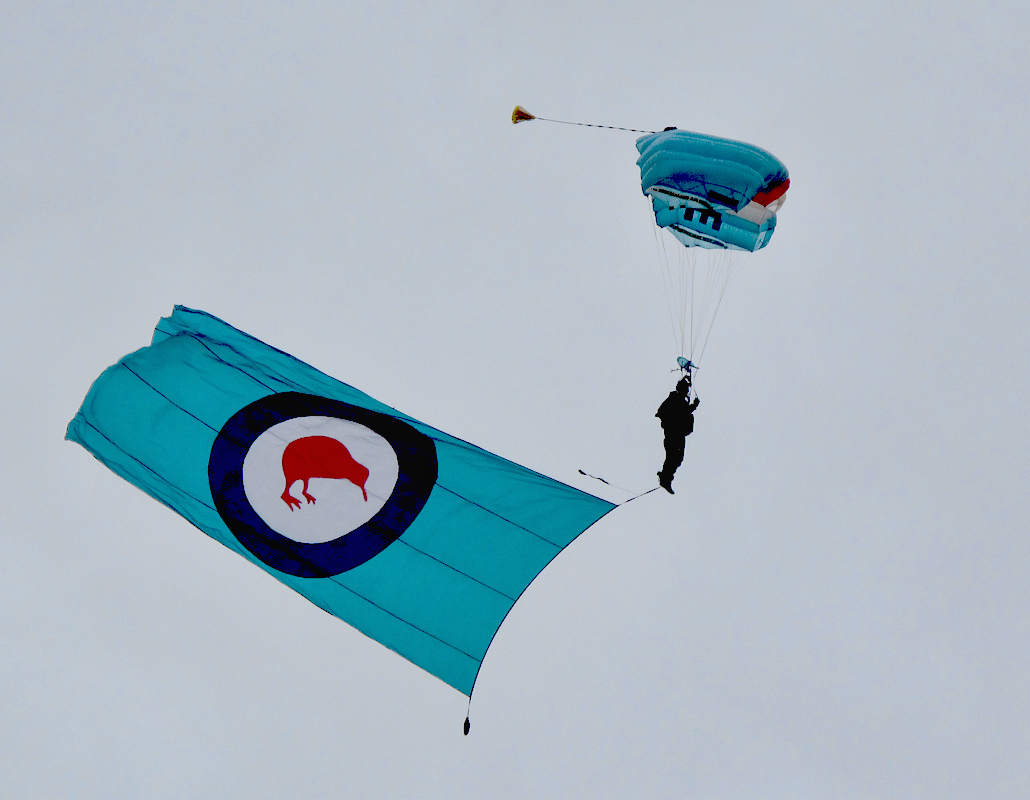
A member of the RNZAF Parachute Training and Support Unit trails the paratrooper flag during the air show at Whenuapai in March 2009.

The RNZAF ensign was approved in 1939, based on the ensign of the Royal Air Force, with the letters "NZ" inserted within the roundel. Until the 1950s NZPAF and RNZAF aircraft flew with Royal Air Force roundels; sometimes only the "NZ" prefix to the serial number revealed its nationality within the Commonwealth. A white kiwi or silver fern on a black background or a New Zealand flag frequently appeared on RNZAF aircraft, and also on RAF aircraft with NZ aircrew. Map outlines of New Zealand with a Kiwi superimposed appeared on the tails of Canberras flown from Singapore in the Malayan Emergency; Venoms used in the conflict had a white kiwi on a black tail.

From the mid-1950s RNZAF roundels were modified by a fern frond within the inner red circle. Several colours were tried, including green, gold and finally white. The first two were too difficult to spot and the last looked too much like a white feather that further attempts with ferns were dropped and the Kiwi bird was adopted at the end of the 1960s. To assist camouflage in the 1980s the white was sometimes eliminated, giving a red kiwi within a blue circle (e.g. on Hercules, Aermacchis and Skyhawks).

Since the early 2000s, the kiwi roundel is now a black circle around a black kiwi (C-130J Super Hercules, NH90, Agusta 109) or two-tone grey for maritime aircraft, (P-8 Poseidon, SH-2G Seasprite). The nose is always forward and on wings the legs are inwards, towards to the fuselage. Training aircraft such as the T-6 Texan II retain the traditional blue, red and white kiwi roundel.

The use of the kiwi, a flightless bird, on the roundel has been the source of some amusement both in New Zealand and overseas.

== Ranks and uniform ==
RNZAF rank titles and uniform remain similar to the Royal Air Force. The rank structure of the RNZAF was established within the context of the desire to ensure that the service remained separate from both the Army and Navy. The rank structure came to be:

- Junior Ranks: Aviator Classification, Leading Aviator Classification
- Non-Commissioned Officers: Corporal, Sergeant, Flight Sergeant, Warrant Officer
- Commissioned Officers: Pilot Officer, Flying Officer, Flight Lieutenant, Squadron Leader, Wing Commander, Group Captain, Air Commodore, Air Vice-Marshal, Air Marshal

The service dress uniform is deep blue in colour with light blue coloured rank worn on the sleeves of the uniform. There are many variations of the uniform that personnel wear during the course of their duties. Since 2010 the shoulder identifier says "ROYAL NEW ZEALAND AIR FORCE"; this was to correct a perceived confusion with the uniform of the New Zealand Police, despite many other more obvious differences.

In 2022 the RNZAF selected the multi terrain pattern (NZMTP) uniform for all ground trades. The uniform was selected to replace the General Purpose Uniform (GPU) that had been in service since 2015. GPU was deemed ineffective for a number of reasons, one that it was not suitable for overseas operations due to having no camouflage pattern, and secondly due to its heat retention in warmer climates.

In 2016 as part of the Air Warrior project, aircrew began trialling MultiCam uniform to replace the DPM variant they have been using since the late 1980s. Trials for the uniform will be completed in 2016. For all flying duties aircrew wear a Nomex flame retardant green coloured one or two piece flight suit. Operations to a desert environment see aircrew wear a sand coloured version of the green uniform.

=== Aircrew flying badges and uniform name patches ===
RNZAF badges closely follow the style inherited from the Royal Air Force, with a badge worn on the left breast. A key difference is that pilot's wings bear the letters NZ rather than RAF, and that the single wing of other aircrew still have the letters of the trade they represent.

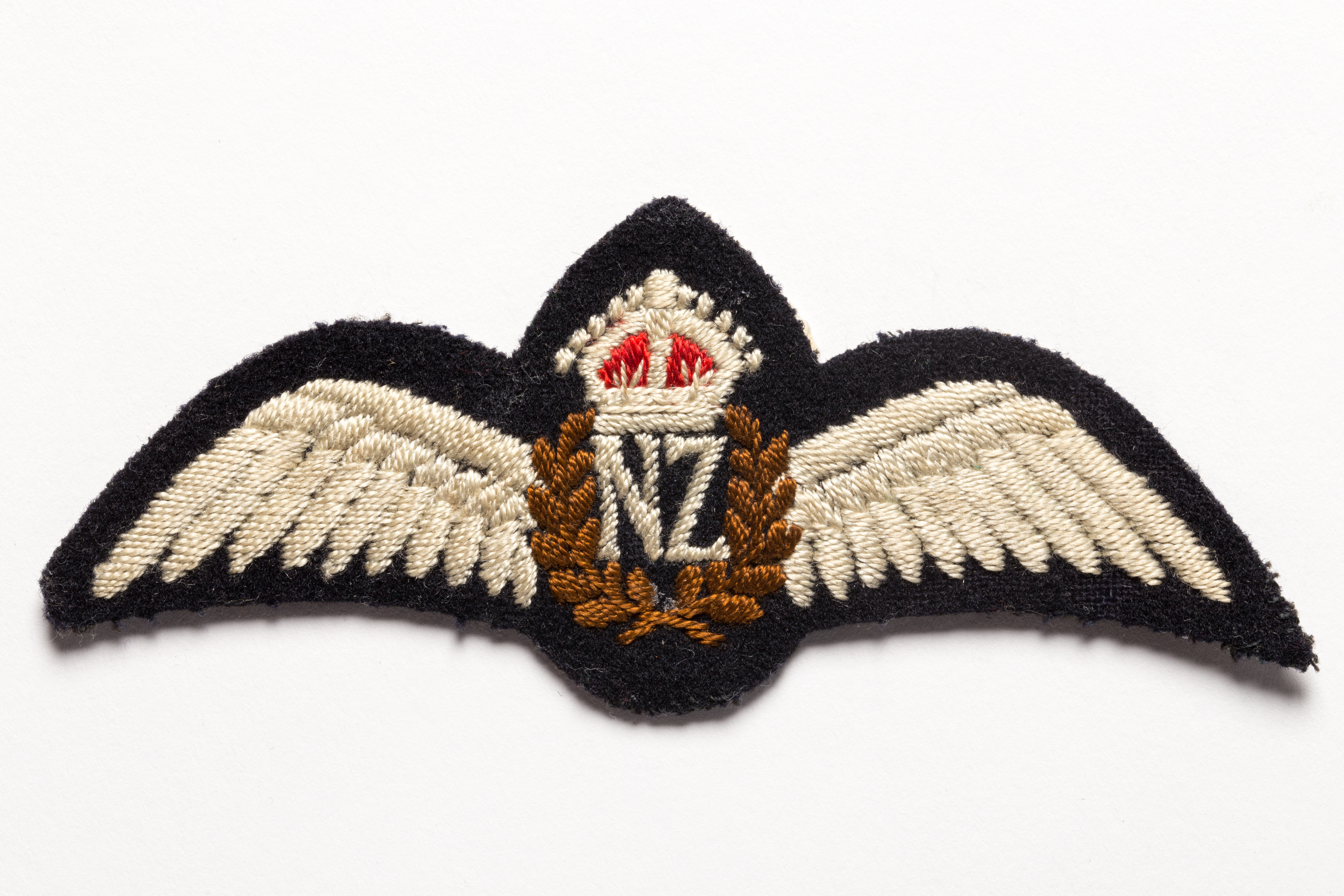
RNZAF Flying Badge

Flying badges
Crew designation	Details	Active	Retired
Pilot	NZ lettering	1923	
Air Warfare Officer Air Warfare Specialist	AW lettering	2007	
Engineer	E lettering	1942	2025
Loadmaster	LM lettering	1970	
Air Ordnanceman	AO lettering	1966	2023
Helicopter Loadmaster	HL lettering	2016	
Flight Steward	FS lettering	1980	
Parachute Jump Instructor	Parachute patch	1963	
Helicopter Crewman	HC lettering	1966	2016
Navigator	N lettering	1942	2007
Air Bomber	B lettering	1941	1953
Electronics Operator	AE lettering	1966	2007
Air Quartermaster	QM lettering	1965	1970
Air Signaller	S lettering	1948	1977
Air Gunner	AG lettering	1939	1953
Observer	O letter outline	1934	1942

=== Commissioned officer ranks ===
The rank insignia of commissioned officers.

Rank group	General / flag officers				Senior officers			Junior officers
Royal New Zealand Air Force
Royal New Zealand Air Force	Marshal of the RNZAF	Air marshal	Air vice-marshal	Air commodore	Group captain	Wing commander	Squadron leader	Flight lieutenant	Flying officer	Pilot officer

=== Other ranks ===
The rank insignia of non-commissioned officers and enlisted personnel.

Rank group	Senior NCOs			Junior NCOs	Enlisted
Royal New Zealand Air Force
Royal New Zealand Air Force	Warrant Officer	Flight Sergeant	Sergeant	Corporal	Leading Aviator Classification	Aviator Classification

== Future of the RNZAF ==
Following the successful modernisation of its maritime patrol and tactical airlift fleets with P-8 Poseidon and C-130J Super Hercules aircraft, the Royal New Zealand Air Force continues to prepare further re-capitalisation projects as set forth in the 2019 Defence Capability Plan and the Major Projects Report 2020.

Foremost amongst these projects are the replacement of the Super Seasprite naval helicopters and the aging Boeing 757s. Following a series of breakdowns in 2024, the NZ Government announced in December 2024 its search for an off-the-shelf replacement for the Boeing 757s. The Boeing 737 MAX 8 and Airbus A321neo were shortlisted for consideration, subject to final Cabinet approval.

Although discussed in the media and defence circles from time to time, there are no current plans to re-instate the RNZAF's air combat capability. The strike wing was disbanded under the Labour Government in 2001 without replacement of the A-4 Skyhawk and Aermacchi MB-339 aircraft.

== See also ==
- Military history of New Zealand
- List of squadrons of the RNZAF
- List of aircraft of the Royal New Zealand Air Force and Royal New Zealand Navy
- List of individual weapons of the New Zealand armed forces
- List of New Zealand military bases
- RNZAF Security Forces
- List of World War I aces from New Zealand
- List of former Royal New Zealand Air Force stations
- New Zealand Air Training Corps
- Disbandment of the RNZAF air combat force
- Air Force Museum of New Zealand
- New Zealand Defence College
- Black Falcons

== Bibliography ==
- Bentley, Geoffrey (1969). RNZAF – A Short History (Hardback). Wellington: A.H. & A. W. Reed.
- Dawson, Bee (2017) Laucala Bay: The Story of the RNZAF in Fiji 1939 to 1967 (Softback), Random House, ISBN 9780143770381
- Hewson, Brian J. (1999). Goliath's apprentice: The Royal New Zealand Air Force and the United States in the Pacific war, 1941–1945 (PDF) (Thesis). Christchurch: University of Canterbury.
- Lambert, Max (ed.): 1989 Air New Zealand Almanac, New Zealand Press Association, 1988, ISSN 0112-2444
- McClure, Margaret (2012). Fighting Spirit – 75 Years of the RNZAF (Hardback). Auckland: Random House. ISBN 978-1-86979-610-5.
- Sanders, James: A Long Patrol, An Illustrated History of No 1 Squadron RNZAF, 1986, Century Hutchinson, Auckland, ISBN 0-09-163600-0.
- Spencer, Alex M (2020). British Imperial Air Power: The Royal Air Forces and the Defense of Australia and New Zealand Between the World Wars. Indiana: Purdue University Press. ISBN 978-1-55753-940-3.
