= Vought F4U Corsair =

1940 fighter aircraft family by Chance Vought

F4U/FG/F3A Corsair
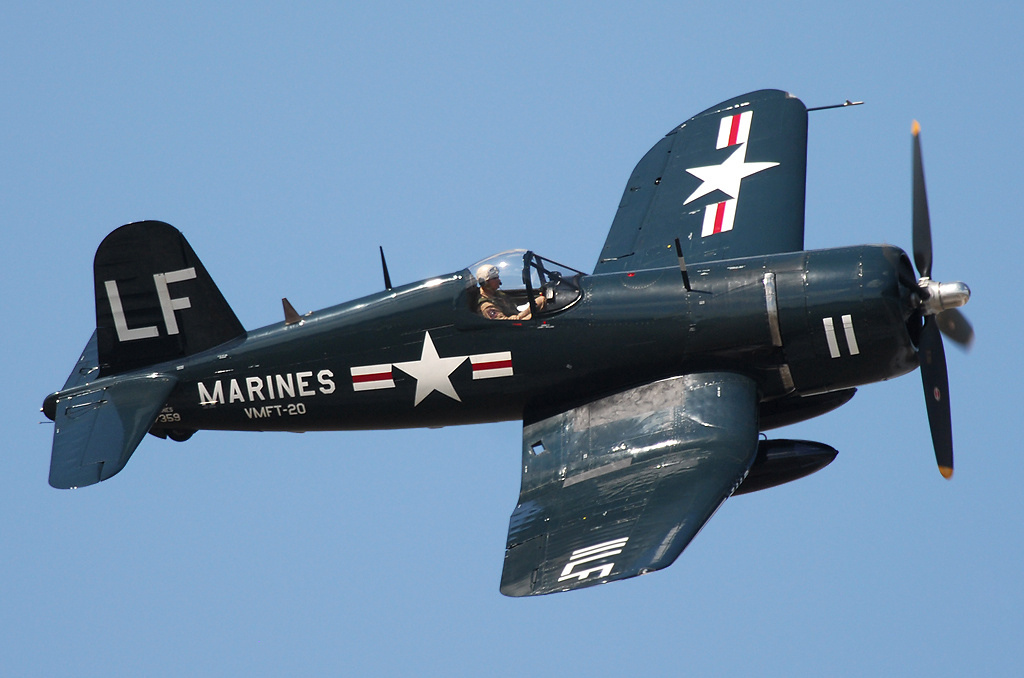
- A restored F4U-4 Corsair in Korean War-era U.S. Marine Corps markings

General information
- Type: Carrier-based fighter-bomber
- National origin: United States
- Manufacturer: Chance Vought
- Built by: Goodyear; Brewster
- Primary users: United States Navy: United States Marine Corps; Royal Navy; Royal New Zealand Air Force
- Number built: More than 12,571

History
- Manufactured: 1942–1953
- Introduction date: 28 December 1942
- First flight: 29 May 1940
- Retired: 1953 (United States); 1979 (Honduras)
- Variant: Goodyear F2G Corsair

The Vought F4U Corsair is an American fighter aircraft that saw service primarily in World War II and the Korean War. Designed and initially manufactured by Chance Vought, the Corsair was soon in great demand; additional production contracts were given to Goodyear, whose Corsairs were designated FG, and Brewster, designated F3A.

The Corsair was designed and principally operated as a carrier-based aircraft, and entered service in large numbers with the U.S. Navy and Marines in World War II. It quickly became one of the most capable carrier-based fighter-bombers of the war. Some Japanese pilots regarded it as the most formidable American fighter, and U.S. naval aviators' claims suggested an 11:1 kill ratio. Early problems with carrier landings and logistics led to it being eclipsed as the dominant carrier-based fighter by the Grumman F6F Hellcat, powered by the same Double Wasp engine first flown on the Corsair's initial prototype in 1940. The Corsair's early deployment was to land-based squadrons of the U.S. Marine Corps and U.S. Navy.

The Corsair served almost exclusively as a fighter-bomber throughout the Korean War and during the French colonial wars in Indochina and Algeria. In addition to its use by the U.S. and British, the Corsair was also used by the Royal New Zealand Air Force, French Naval Aviation, and other air forces until the 1960s.

From the prototype delivery to the U.S. Navy in 1940, to final delivery in 1953 to the French, 12,571 F4U Corsairs were manufactured in 16 separate models. Its 1942–1953 production run was the longest of any U.S. piston-engined fighter.

== Development ==
In February 1938, the U.S. Navy Bureau of Aeronautics published two requests for proposal for twin-engined and single-engined fighters. For the single-engined fighter, the Navy requested the maximum obtainable speed, and a minimum stalling speed not higher than 70 miles per hour (110 km/h; 61 kn). A range of 1,000 miles (1,600 km) was specified. The fighter had to carry four guns, or three with increased ammunition. Provision had to be made for anti-aircraft bombs to be carried in the wing. These small bombs would, according to thinking in the 1930s, be dropped on enemy aircraft formations.

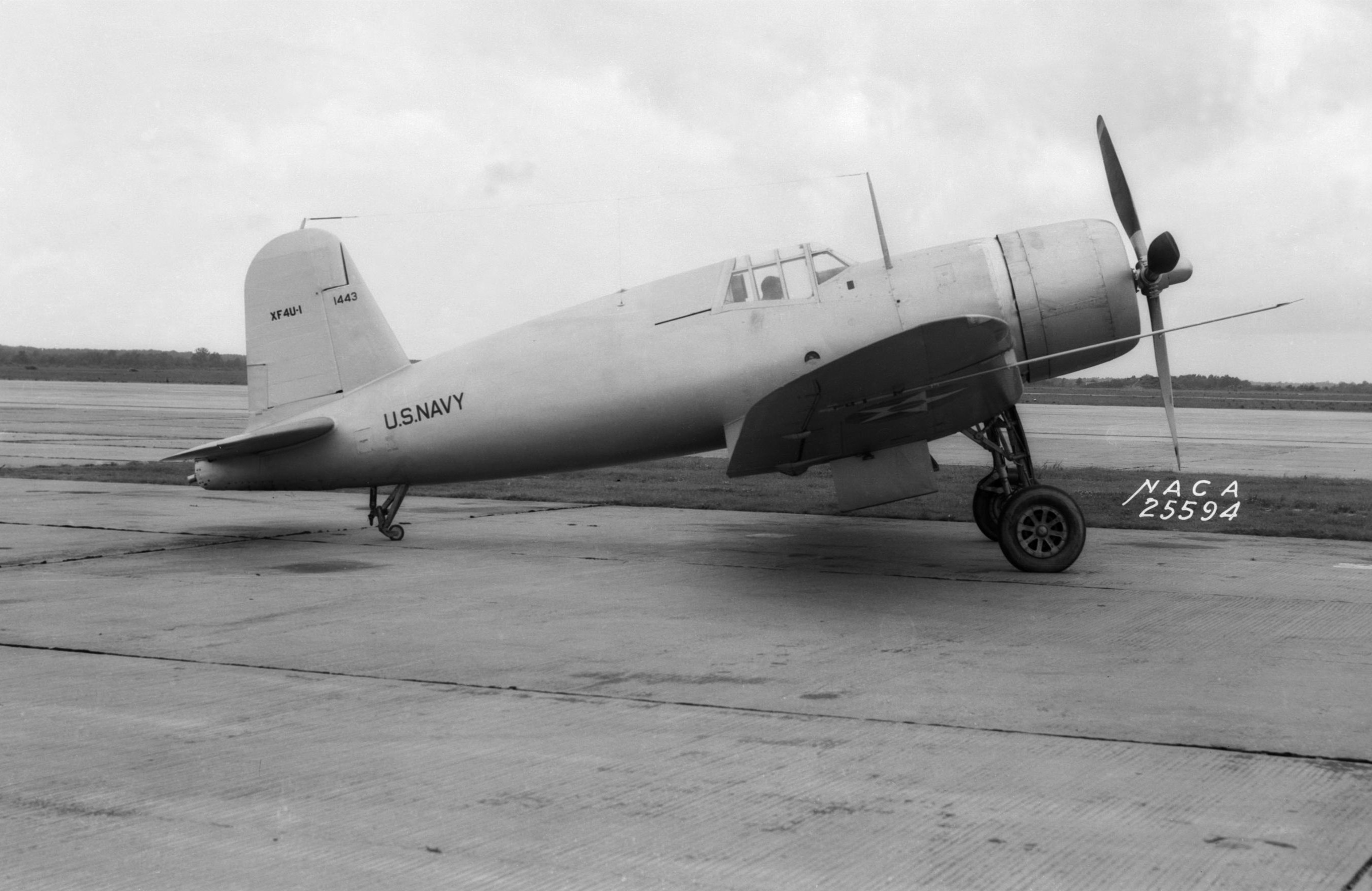
The XF4U-1 prototype in 1940/41, showing its more forward cockpit location

In June 1938, the U.S. Navy signed a contract with Vought for a prototype bearing the factory designation V-166B, the XF4U-1, BuNo 1443. The Corsair design team was led by Rex Beisel. After mock-up inspection in February 1939, construction of the XF4U-1 powered by an XR-2800-4 prototype of the Pratt & Whitney R-2800 Double Wasp twin-row, 18-cylinder radial engine, rated at 1,805 hp (1,350 kW) went ahead quickly, as the first airframe ever designed from the start to have a Double Wasp engine fitted for flight. When the prototype was completed, it had the biggest and most powerful engine, the largest propeller, and probably the largest wing on any naval fighter to date. The first flight of the XF4U-1 was made on 29 May 1940, with Lyman A. Bullard, Jr. at the controls. The maiden flight proceeded normally until a hurried landing was made when the elevator trim tabs failed because of flutter.

On 1 October 1940, the XF4U-1 became the first single-engined U.S. fighter to fly faster than 400 mph (640 km/h; 350 kn) by flying at an average ground speed of 405 mph (652 km/h; 352 kn) from Stratford to Hartford. The USAAC's twin engine Lockheed P-38 Lightning had flown over 400 mph in January–February 1939. The XF4U-1 also had an excellent rate of climb, although testing revealed some requirements would have to be rewritten. In full-power dive tests, speeds up to 550 mph (890 km/h) were achieved, but not without damage to the control surfaces and access panels, and in one case, an engine failure. The spin recovery standards also had to be relaxed, as recovery from the required two-turn spin proved impossible without resorting to an antispin chute. The problems clearly meant delays in getting the design into production.

Reports coming back from the war in Europe indicated an armament of two .30 in (7.62 mm) synchronized engine cowling-mount machine guns, and two .50 in (12.7 mm) machine guns (one in each outer wing panel) were insufficient. The U.S. Navy's November 1940 production proposals specified heavier armament. The increased armament comprised three .50 caliber machine guns mounted in each wing panel. This improvement greatly increased the Corsair's ability to shoot down enemy aircraft.

Formal U.S. Navy acceptance trials for the XF4U-1 began in February 1941. The Navy entered into a letter of intent on 3 March 1941, received Vought's production proposal on 2 April, and awarded Vought a contract for 584 F4U-1 fighters, which were given the name "Corsair" – inherited from the firm's late-1920s Vought O2U naval biplane scout, which first bore the name – on 30 June of the same year. The first production F4U-1 performed its initial flight a year later, on 24 June 1942. It was a remarkable achievement for Vought; compared to land-based counterparts, carrier aircraft are "overbuilt" and heavier, to withstand the extreme stress of deck landings.

== Design ==
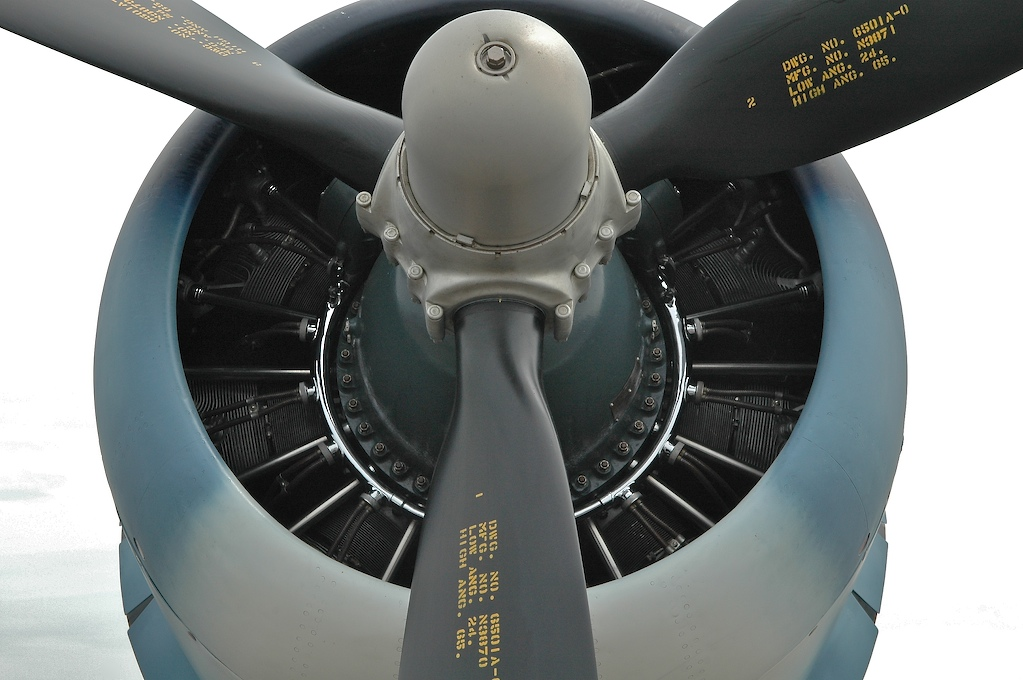
2,000 hp (1,500 kW) Pratt & Whitney R-2800-8 in a Goodyear FG-1 Corsair

=== Engine considerations ===
The F4U incorporated the largest engine available at the time, the 2,000 hp (1,500 kW) 18-cylinder Pratt & Whitney R-2800 Double Wasp radial. To extract as much power as possible, a relatively large Hamilton Standard Hydromatic three-blade propeller of 13 feet 4 inches (4.06 m) was used.

=== Landing gear and wings ===
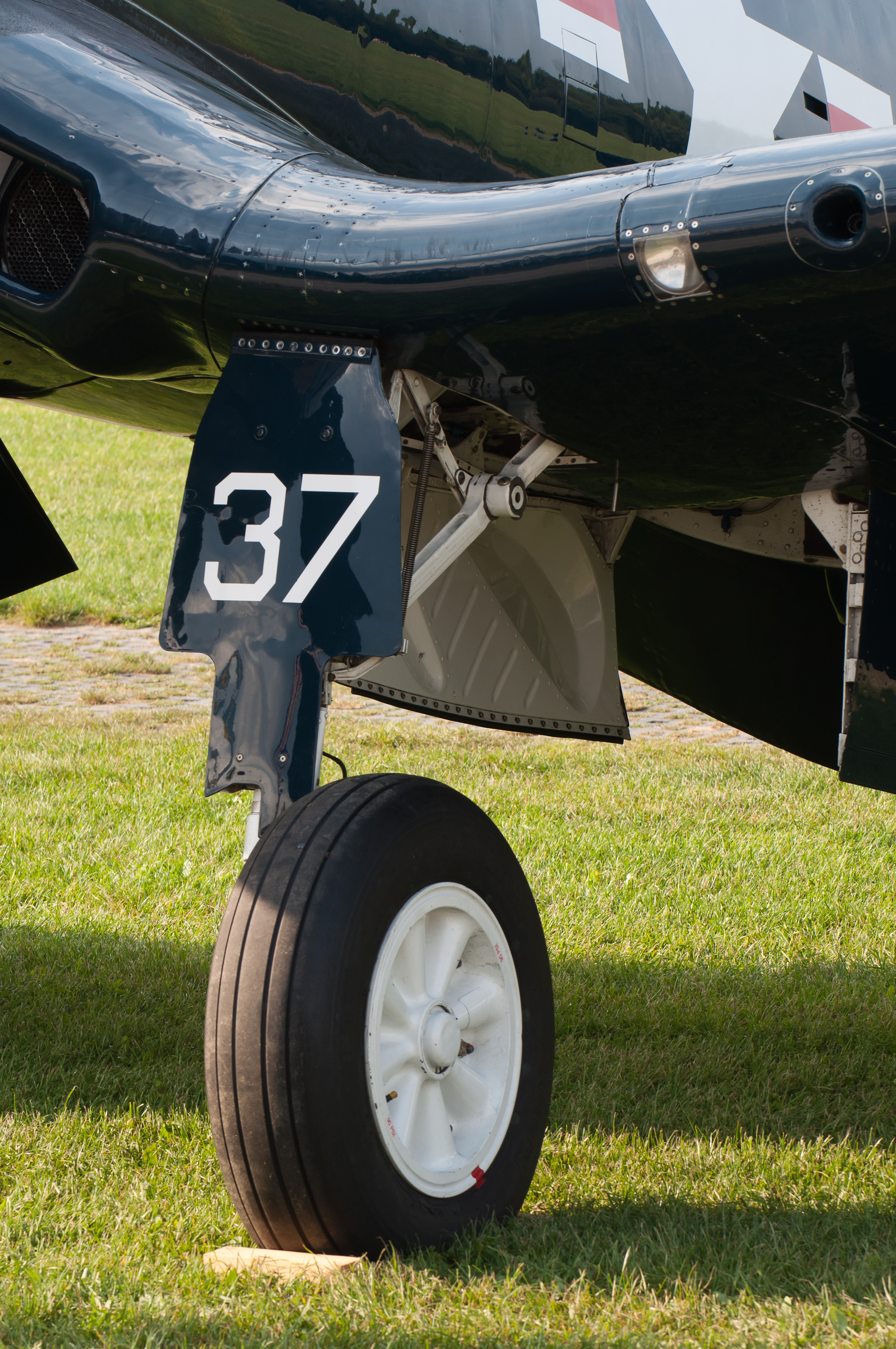
Landing gear on an F4U-4 Corsair.

To accommodate a folding wing, the designers considered retracting the main landing gear rearward, but for the chosen chord of wing, making the landing gear struts long enough to provide ground clearance for the large propeller proved difficult. Their solution was an inverted gull wing, which considerably shortened the required length of the struts. The anhedral of the wing's inboard section also permitted the wing and fuselage to meet at the optimum angle for minimizing drag, without using wing-root fairings. The bent wing was heavier and more difficult to construct, however, offsetting these benefits.

The Corsair's aerodynamics were an advance over those of contemporary naval fighters. The F4U was the first U.S. Navy aircraft to feature landing gear that retracted into a fully enclosed wheel well. The landing gear oleo struts—each with its own strut door enclosing it when retracted—rotated through 90° during retraction, with the wheel atop the lower end of the strut when retracted. A pair of rectangular doors enclosed each wheel well, leaving a streamlined wing. This swiveling, aft-retracting landing gear design was common to the Curtiss P-40 (and its predecessor, the P-36), as adopted for the F4U Corsair's main gear and its Pacific War counterpart, the Grumman F6F Hellcat. The oil coolers were mounted in the heavily anhedraled inboard section of the wings, alongside the supercharger air intakes, and used openings in the leading edges of the wings, rather than protruding scoops. The large fuselage panels were made of aluminum and were attached to the frames with the newly developed technique of spot welding, thus mostly eliminating the use of rivets. While employing this new technology, the Corsair was also the last American-produced fighter aircraft to feature fabric as the skinning for the top and bottom of each outer wing, aft of the main spar and armament bays, and for the ailerons, elevators, and rudder. The elevators were also constructed from plywood. The Corsair, even with its streamlining and high-speed abilities, could fly slowly enough for carrier landings with full flap deployment of 50°.

=== Technical issues ===
In part because of its technological advances and its top speed exceeding that of existing Navy aircraft, numerous technical problems had to be solved before the Corsair entered service. Carrier suitability was a major development issue, prompting changes to the main landing gear, tail wheel, and tailhook. Early F4U-1s had difficulty recovering from developed spins, since the inverted gull wing's shape interfered with elevator authority. It was also found that the Corsair's left wing could stall and drop rapidly and without warning during slow carrier landings. In addition, if the throttle were suddenly advanced (for example, during an aborted landing), the left wing could stall and drop so quickly that the fighter could flip over with the rapid increase in power. These potentially lethal characteristics were later solved through the addition of a small, 6 in (150 mm)-long stall strip to the leading edge of the outer right wing, just outboard of the gun ports. This allowed the right wing to stall at the same time as the left.

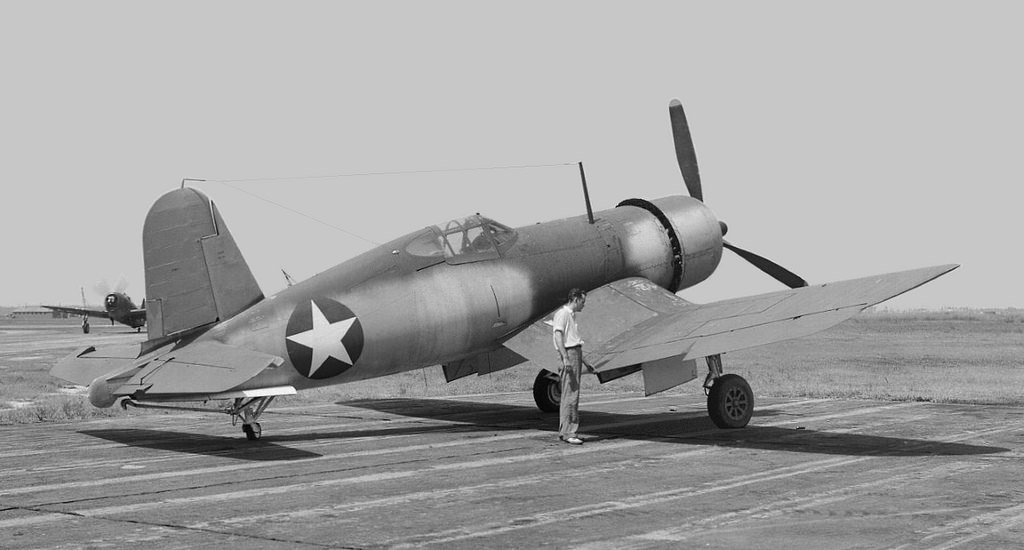
An early F4U-1 showing the "birdcage" canopy with rearwards production cockpit location.

Other problems were encountered during early carrier trials. Visibility problems caused by the Corsair's combination of an aft-mounted cockpit and long nose made landings hazardous for newly trained pilots. During landing approaches, it was found that oil from the opened hydraulically powered cowl flaps could spatter onto the windscreen, severely reducing visibility, and the undercarriage oleo struts had bad rebound characteristics on landing, allowing the aircraft to bounce down the carrier deck. The first problem was solved by locking the top cowl flaps in front of the windscreen down permanently, then replacing them with a fixed panel. The undercarriage bounce took longer to resolve, but eventually a "bleed valve" incorporated into the legs allowed the hydraulic pressure to be released gradually as the aircraft landed. The Corsair was not considered fit for carrier use until the wing-stall problems and deck bounce could be solved.

Meanwhile, the more docile and easier-to-build F6F Hellcat had begun entering service for its intended carrier-based role. The Navy aimed to standardize on a single type of carrier fighter, and although the Hellcat was slower than the Corsair, it was deemed simpler for inexperienced pilots to land on a carrier. The Hellcat proved to be successful almost immediately after its introduction. The Navy's decision to select the Hellcat allowed the Corsair to be assigned to the U.S. Marine Corps. With no initial requirement for carrier landings, the Marine Corps deployed the Corsair to devastating effect from land bases. Deployment of the Corsair aboard U.S. carriers was delayed until late 1944, by which time the last of the carrier landing issues related to the Corsair's long nose had been addressed by the British. (Note: A landing technique using a curving approach that kept the LSO (landing signal officer) in view while coming aboard was developed by the Royal Navy and was adopted by the U.S. Navy.)

=== Design modifications ===
Production F4U-1s featured several major modifications from the XF4U-1. A change of armament to six wing-mounted .50 in (12.7 mm) M2 Browning machine guns (three in each outer wing panel) and their ammunition (400 rounds for the inner pair, 375 rounds for the outer) meant the location of the wing fuel tanks had to be changed. To keep the fuel tank close to the center of gravity, the only available position was in the forward fuselage, ahead of the cockpit. Accordingly, as a 237 US gal (897 L) self-sealing fuel tank replaced the fuselage-mounted armament, the cockpit had to be moved back by 32 in (810 mm) and the fuselage lengthened. Later on, different variants of the F4U were given different armaments. While most Corsair variants had the standard armament of six .50 caliber M2 Browning machine guns, some (like the F4U-1C) were equipped with four 20 millimeter M2 cannons for their main weapon. While these cannons were more powerful than the standard machine guns, they were not favored over the standard loadout. Only 200 units of this particular Corsair variant were produced, out of the total of 12,571. Other variants were capable of carrying mission-specific weapons such as rockets and bombs. The F4U could carry up to eight rockets, four under each wing. It could carry up to 4,000 pounds of explosive ordnance. This helped the Corsair take on a fighter-bomber role, giving it greater versatility as both a ground-support aircraft and a fighter. In addition, 150 lb (68 kg) of armor plate was installed, along with a 1.5 in (38 mm) bullet-proof windscreen which was set internally, behind the curved Plexiglas windscreen. The canopy could be jettisoned in an emergency, and half-elliptical planform transparent panels, much like those of certain variants of the Curtiss P-40, were inset into the sides of the fuselage's turtledeck structure behind the pilot's headrest, providing the pilot with a limited rear view over his shoulders. A rectangular Plexiglas panel was inset into the lower center section to allow the pilot to see directly beneath the aircraft and assist with deck landings. (Note: F2A Buffalos and F4F Wildcats used similar glazed panels. Before the F4U-4, Corsair cockpits lacked a complete floor.) The engine used was the more powerful R-2800-8 (B series) Double Wasp which produced 2,000 hp (1,500 kW). On the wings, the flaps were changed to a NACA slotted type, and the ailerons were increased in span to increase the roll rate, with a consequent reduction in flap span. IFF transponder equipment was fitted in the rear fuselage. These changes increased the Corsair's weight by several hundred pounds.

=== Performance ===
The performance of the Corsair was superior to most of its contemporaries. The F4U-1 was considerably faster than the Grumman F6F Hellcat and only 13 mph (21 km/h) slower than the Republic P-47 Thunderbolt. The R-2800 powered all three. But whereas the P-47 achieved its highest speed at 30,020 feet (9,150 m) with the help of an intercooled turbocharger, the F4U-1 reached its maximum speed at 19,900 ft (6,100 m) using a mechanically supercharged engine.

== Operational history ==
=== World War II ===
==== U.S. service ====
===== Navy testing and release to the U.S. Marine Corps =====
The U.S. Navy received its first production F4U-1 on 31 July 1942, though getting it into service proved difficult. The framed "birdcage" style canopy provided inadequate visibility for deck taxiing, and the long "hose nose" and nose-up attitude of the Corsair made it difficult to see straight ahead. The enormous torque of the Double Wasp engine also made it a handful for inexperienced pilots if they were forced to bolter. Early Navy pilots called the F4U the "hog", "hosenose", or "bent-wing Widow Maker".

Carrier qualification trials on the training carrier USS Wolverine and escort carriers USS Core and USS Charger in 1942 found that, despite visibility issues and control sensitivity, the Corsair was "...an excellent carrier type and very easy to land aboard. It is no different than any other airplane." Two Navy units, VF-12 (October 1942) and later VF-17 (April 1943) were equipped with the F4U. By April 1943, VF-12 had completed deck landing qualification.

At the time, the U.S. Navy also had the Grumman F6F Hellcat, which did not match the F4U's performance but was a better deck-landing aircraft. The Corsair was declared "ready for combat" at the end of 1942, though qualified to operate only from land bases until the last of the carrier qualification issues were worked out. VF-17 went aboard the USS Bunker Hill in late 1943, and the Chief of Naval Operations wanted to equip four air groups with Corsairs by the end of 1943. The Commander, Air Forces, Pacific had a different opinion, stating that "In order to simplify spares problems and also to insure flexibility in carrier operations present practice in the Pacific is to assign all Corsairs to Marines and to equip FightRons [fighter squadrons] on medium and light carriers with Hellcats." VF-12 soon abandoned its aircraft to the Marines. VF-17 kept its Corsairs, but was removed from its carrier, USS Bunker Hill, due to perceived difficulties in supplying parts at sea.

The Marines needed a better fighter than the F4F Wildcat. For them, it was not as important that the F4U could be recovered aboard a carrier, as they usually flew from land bases. Growing pains aside, Marine Corps squadrons readily took to the radical new fighter.

===== Marine Corps combat =====
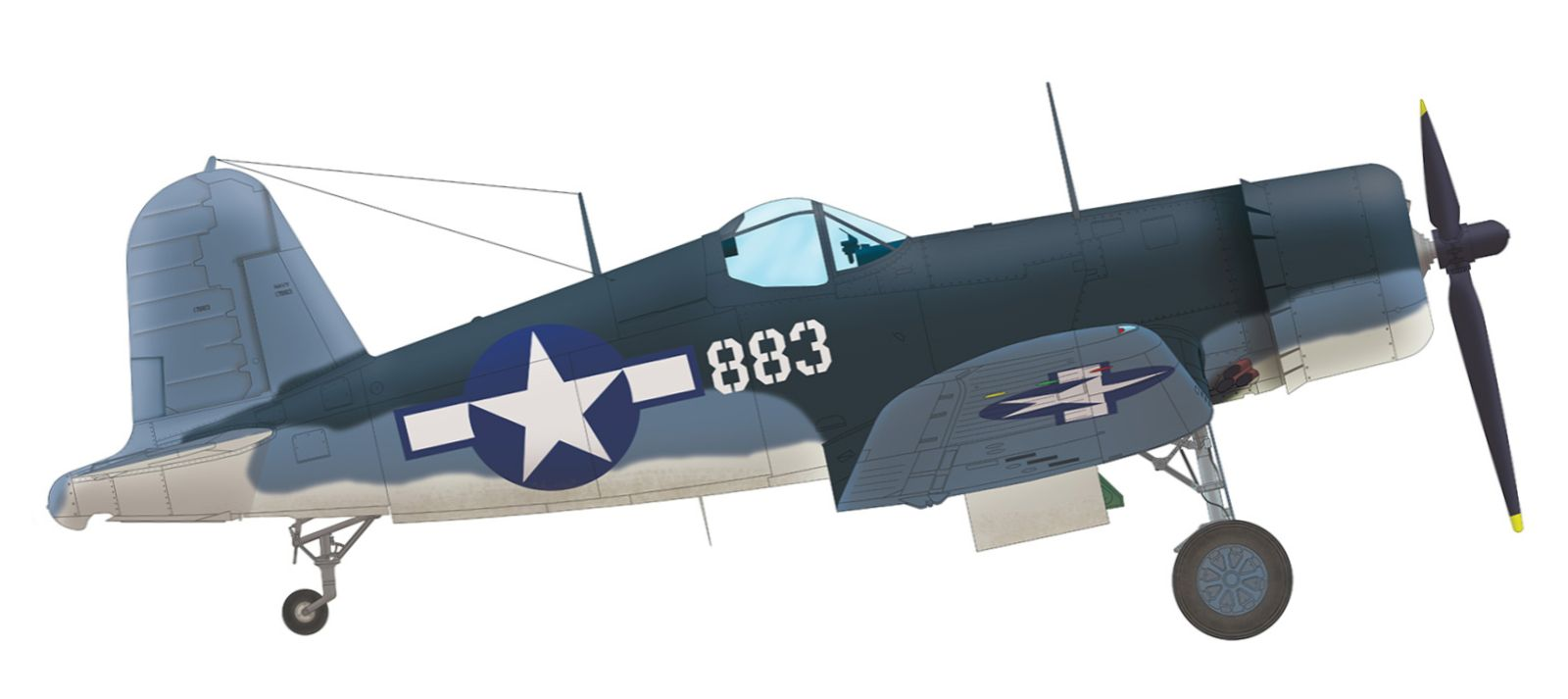
Vought F4U-1A Corsair, BuNo 17883, of Gregory "Pappy" Boyington, the commander of VMF-214, Vella Lavella end of 1943

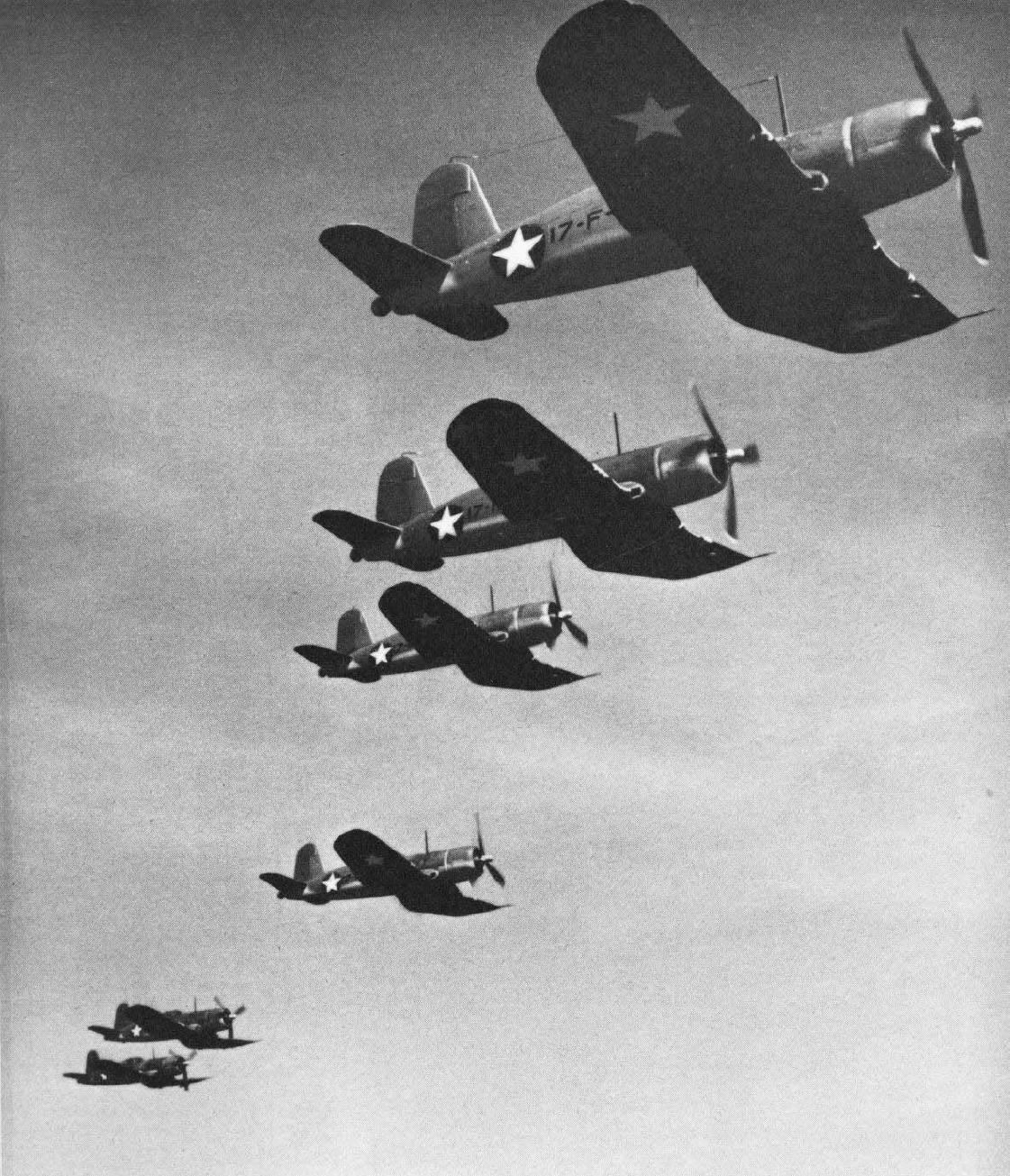
Early F4U-1s of VF-17

From February 1943 onward, the F4U operated from Guadalcanal and ultimately other bases in the Solomon Islands. A dozen USMC F4U-1s of VMF-124, commanded by Major William E. Gise, arrived at Henderson Field (code name "Cactus") on 12 February. The first recorded combat engagement was on 14 February 1943, when Corsairs of VMF-124 under Major Gise assisted P-40s and P-38s in escorting a formation of Consolidated B-24 Liberators on a raid against a Japanese aerodrome at Kahili. Japanese fighters contested the raid, and the Americans got the worst of it, with four P-38s, two P-40s, two Corsairs, and two Liberators lost. No more than four Japanese Zeros were destroyed. A Corsair was responsible for one of the kills, albeit due to a midair collision when 252nd Kokutai pilot Yoshio Yoshido collided with 1st Lieutenant Gordon Lee Lyon Jr. The fiasco was referred to as the "Saint Valentine's Day Massacre". Despite the debut, the Marines quickly learned how to make better use of the aircraft and started demonstrating its superiority over Japanese fighters. By May, the Corsair units were getting the upper hand, and VMF-124 had produced the first Corsair ace, Second Lieutenant Kenneth A. Walsh, who would rack up a total of 21 kills during the war. He remembered:

I learned quickly that altitude was paramount. Whoever had altitude dictated the terms of the battle, and there was nothing a Zero pilot could do to change that — we had him. The F4U could outperform a Zero in every aspect except slow speed manoeuvrability and slow speed rate of climb. Therefore you avoided getting slow when combating a Zero. It took time but eventually we developed tactics and deployed them very effectively... There were times, however, that I tangled with a Zero at slow speed, one on one. In these instances I considered myself fortunate to survive a battle. Of my 21 victories, 17 were against Zeros, and I lost five aircraft in combat. I was shot down three times and I crashed one that ploughed into the line back at base and wiped out another F4U.

VMF-113 was activated on 1 January 1943 at Marine Corps Air Station El Toro as part of Marine Base Defense Air Group 41. They were soon given their full complement of 24 F4U Corsairs. On 26 March 1944, while escorting four B-25 bombers on a raid over Ponape, they recorded their first enemy kills, downing eight Japanese aircraft. In April of that year, VMF-113 was tasked with providing air support for the landings at Ujelang. Since the assault was unopposed, the squadron quickly returned to striking Japanese targets in the Marshall Islands for the remainder of 1944.

Corsairs were flown by the "Black Sheep" Squadron (VMF-214, led by Marine Major Gregory "Pappy" Boyington) in an area of the Solomon Islands called "The Slot". Boyington was credited with 22 kills in F4Us (of 28 total, including six in an AVG P-40, although his score with the AVG has been disputed). Other noted Corsair pilots of the period included VMF-124's Kenneth Walsh, James E. Swett, Archie Donahue, and Bill "Casey" Case; VMF-215's Robert M. Hanson and Donald Aldrich; and VF-17's Tommy Blackburn, Roger Hedrick, and Ira Kepford. Nightfighter versions equipped Navy and Marine units afloat and ashore.

One particularly unusual kill was scored by Marine Lieutenant R. R. Klingman of VMF-312 (the "Checkerboards") over Okinawa. Klingman was in pursuit of a Japanese twin-engine aircraft at high altitude when his guns jammed due to the gun lubrication thickening from the extreme cold. He flew into and chopped off the enemy's tail with the large propeller of the Corsair. Despite smashing five inches (130 mm) off the end of his propeller blades, he managed to land safely after this aerial ramming attack. He was awarded the Navy Cross.

At war's end, Corsairs were ashore on Okinawa, combating the kamikaze, and were also flying from fleet and escort carriers. VMF-312, VMF-323, and VMF-224 and some other Marine units met with success in the Battle of Okinawa.

===== Medal of Honor recipients =====
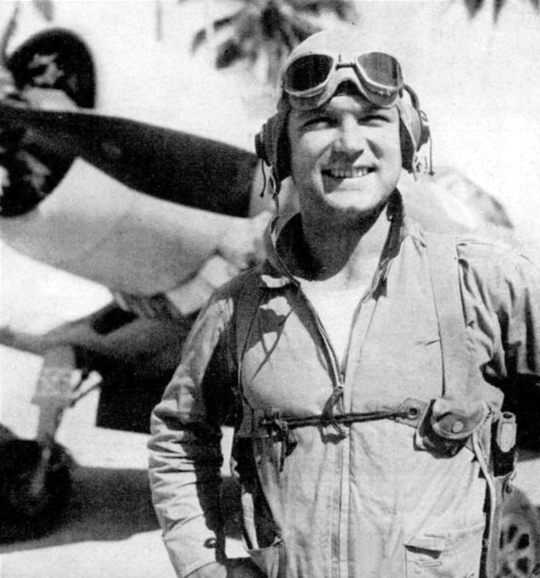
Medal of Honor recipient Robert M. Hanson, standing beside a F4U Corsair

Three Corsair pilots received the Medal of Honor during World War II:

- USMC 1st Lt. Kenneth A. Walsh of the Marine Fighting Squadron 124 was awarded the Medal of Honor for his actions during two separate missions in the Solomon Islands area on 15 and 30 August 1943, flying the Corsair. On 15 August, despite being vastly outnumbered, Walsh on 15 August dove his plane into an enemy formation outnumbering his division six-to-one and, although his Corsair was hit numerous times, shot down three Japanese planes. On 30 August, after developing engine trouble during an escort mission, he landed his disabled Corsair at Munda, replaced it with another, and rejoined his flight. Separated from his group when he encountered approximately 50 Japanese Zeros, he single-handedly attacked, destroying four fighters before enemy fire forced him to make a dead-stick landing off Vella Lavella.
- USMC Maj. Gregory Boyington of the Marine Fighting Squadron 214 was awarded the Medal of Honor for his actions during aerial combat missions in the central Solomon Islands from 12 September 1943 to 3 January 1944, flying the Corsair. Despite being consistently outnumbered during hazardous missions over heavily defended enemy territory, Boyington led his squadron in inflicting significant damage on Japanese aircraft, shipping, and ground installations. During a major engagement over Kahili, he deliberately provoked enemy fighters into combat, destroying numerous Japanese aircraft without loss to his unit. On 28 January 1944, during an aerial battle over Rabaul, Boyington was outnumbered by Japanese Zeros and was shot down after downing one of the enemy planes. He was captured by a Japanese submarine crew and was held as a prisoner of war for more than a year and a half. He was released shortly after the surrender of Japan.
- USMC 1st Lt. Robert M. Hanson of the Marine Fighting Squadron 215 was awarded the Medal of Honor posthumously for his actions during two separate missions in Bougainville Island and New Britain Island on 1 November 1943 and 24 January 1944, flying the Corsair. On 1 November 1943, despite fierce opposition from Japanese formations, Hanson attacked enemy formations, forcing Japanese torpedo bombers to jettison their payload and shooting down one bomber during the defense of Allied landings during the Battle of Empress Augusta Bay. On a later mission on 24 January 1944 over Simpson Harbor, after becoming separated from his formation, he engaged a large number of enemy fighters alone, destroying four Japanese Zeros and possibly a fifth while protecting American bombers. Hanson was killed in action on 3 February 1944.

===== Field modifications for land-based Corsairs =====
Since Corsairs were being operated from shore bases while still awaiting approval for U.S. carrier operations, 965 FG-1As were built as "land planes" without their hydraulic wing-folding mechanisms, in hopes of improving performance by reducing aircraft weight, with the added benefit of minimizing complexity. (These Corsairs' wings could still be manually folded.)

A second option was to remove the folding mechanism in the field using a kit, a procedure that could also be performed on Vought and Brewster Corsairs. On 6 December 1943, the Bureau of Aeronautics issued guidance on weight-reduction measures for the F4U-1, FG-1, and F3A. Corsair squadrons operating from land bases were authorized to remove catapult hooks, arresting hooks, and associated equipment, which eliminated 48 pounds of unnecessary weight. While there are no data to indicate to what extent these modifications were incorporated, there are numerous photos in evidence of Corsairs, of various manufacturers and models, on islands in the Pacific without tailhooks installed. The RNZAF Corsairs were all land-based, and all had the tailhooks removed.

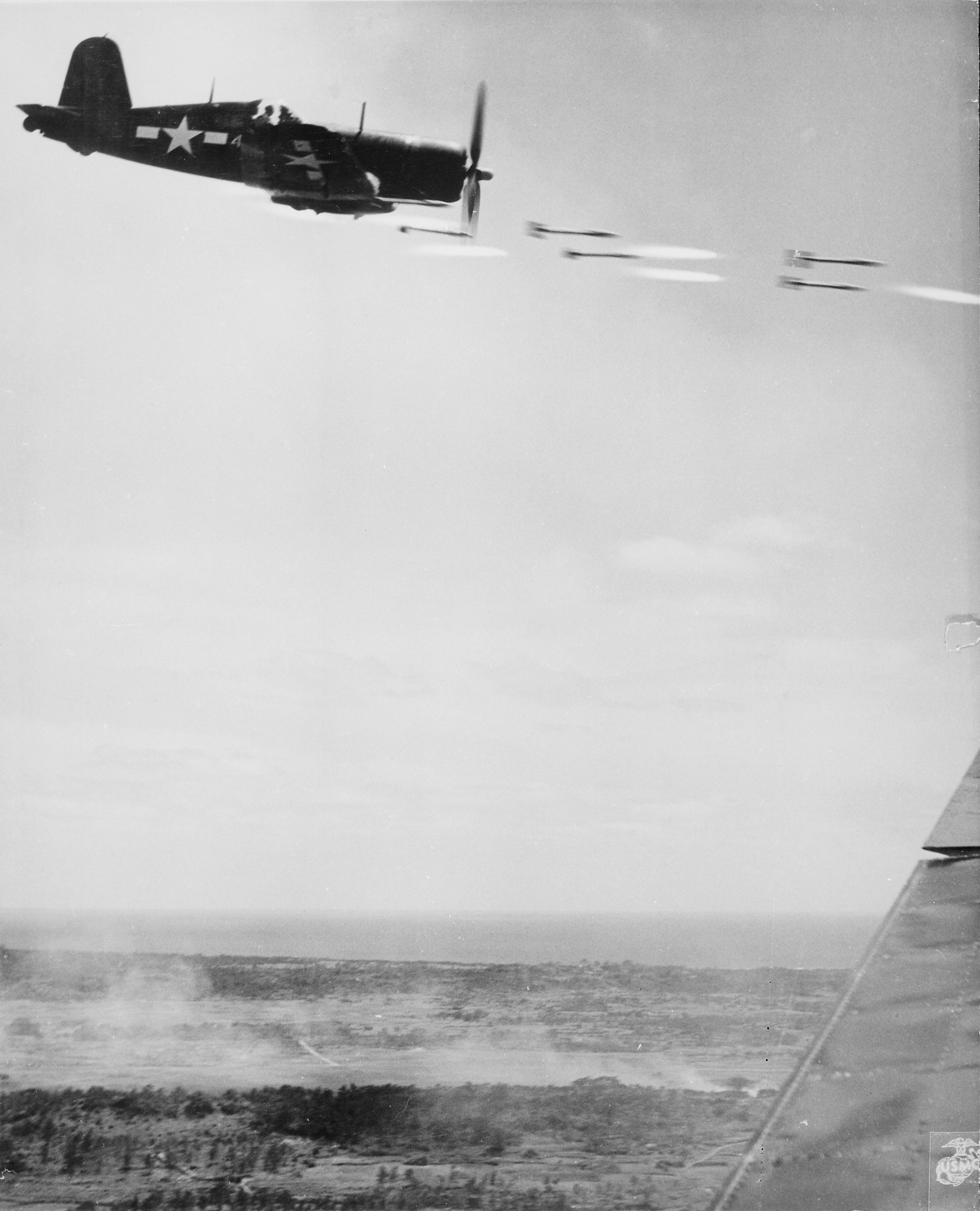
A Corsair fires its rockets at a Japanese stronghold on Okinawa

===== Fighter-bomber =====
Corsairs also served well as fighter-bombers in the Central Pacific and the Philippines. By early 1944, Marine pilots were beginning to exploit the type's considerable capabilities in the close-support role in amphibious landings. Charles Lindbergh flew Corsairs with the Marines as a civilian technical advisor for United Aircraft Corporation to determine how best to increase the Corsair's payload and range in the attack role and to help evaluate future viability of single- versus twin-engine fighter design for Vought. Lindbergh managed to get the F4U into the air with 4,000 pounds (1,800 kg) of bombs, with a 2,000 pounds (900 kg) bomb on the centerline and a 1,000 pounds (450 kg) bomb under each wing. In the course of such experiments, he performed strikes on Japanese positions during the battle for the Marshall Islands.

By the beginning of 1945, the Corsair was a full-blown "mudfighter", performing strikes with high-explosive bombs, napalm tanks, and HVARs. It proved versatile, able to operate everything from Bat glide bombs to 11.75 in (298 mm) Tiny Tim rockets. The aircraft was a prominent participant in the fighting for Palau, Iwo Jima, and Okinawa.

===== Navy service =====
In November 1943, while operating as a shore-based unit in the Solomon Islands, VF-17 reinstalled the tail hooks so its F4Us could land and refuel while providing top cover over the task force participating in the carrier raid on Rabaul. The squadron's pilots landed, refueled, and took off from their former home, Bunker Hill and USS Essex on 11 November 1943.

Twelve USMC F4U-1s arrived at Henderson Field (Guadalcanal) on 12 February 1943. The U.S. Navy did not get into combat with the type until September 1943. The work done by the Royal Navy's FAA meant those models qualified the type for U.S. carrier operations first. The U.S. Navy finally accepted the F4U for shipboard operations in April 1944, after the longer oleo strut was fitted, which eliminated the tendency to bounce. The first US Corsair unit to be based effectively on a carrier was the pioneer USMC squadron VMF-124, which joined Essex in December 1944. They were accompanied by VMF-213. The increasing need for fighter protection against kamikaze attacks resulted in more Corsair units being moved to carriers.

===== Sortie, kill and loss figures =====
U.S. figures compiled at the end of the war indicate that the F4U and FG flew 64,051 operational sorties for the U.S. Marines and U.S. Navy through the conflict (44% of total fighter sorties), with only 9,581 sorties (15%) flown from carrier decks. F4U and FG pilots claimed 2,140 air combat victories against 189 losses to enemy aircraft, for an overall kill ratio of over 11:1. While this gave the Corsair the lowest loss rate of any fighter of the Pacific War, this was due in part to operational circumstances; it primarily faced air-to-air combat in the Solomon Islands and Rabaul campaigns (as well as at Leyte and for kamikaze interception), but as operations shifted north; its mission shifted to ground attack the aircraft saw less exposure to enemy aircraft, while other fighter types were exposed to more air combat. Against the best Japanese opponents, the aircraft claimed a 12:1 kill ratio against the Mitsubishi A6M Zero and 6:1 against the Nakajima Ki-84, Kawanishi N1K-J, and Mitsubishi J2M combined during the last year of the war. The Corsair bore the brunt of U.S. fighter-bomber missions, delivering 15,621 short tons (14,171 metric tons) of bombs during the war (70% of total bombs dropped by U.S. fighters during the war).

Corsair losses in World War II were as follows:

- Aerial combat: 189
- Enemy ground and shipboard anti-aircraft fire: 349
- Operational losses during combat missions: 230
- Operational losses during non-combat flights: 692
- Destroyed aboard ships or on the ground: 164

==== Royal Navy ====
===== Enhancement for carrier suitability =====
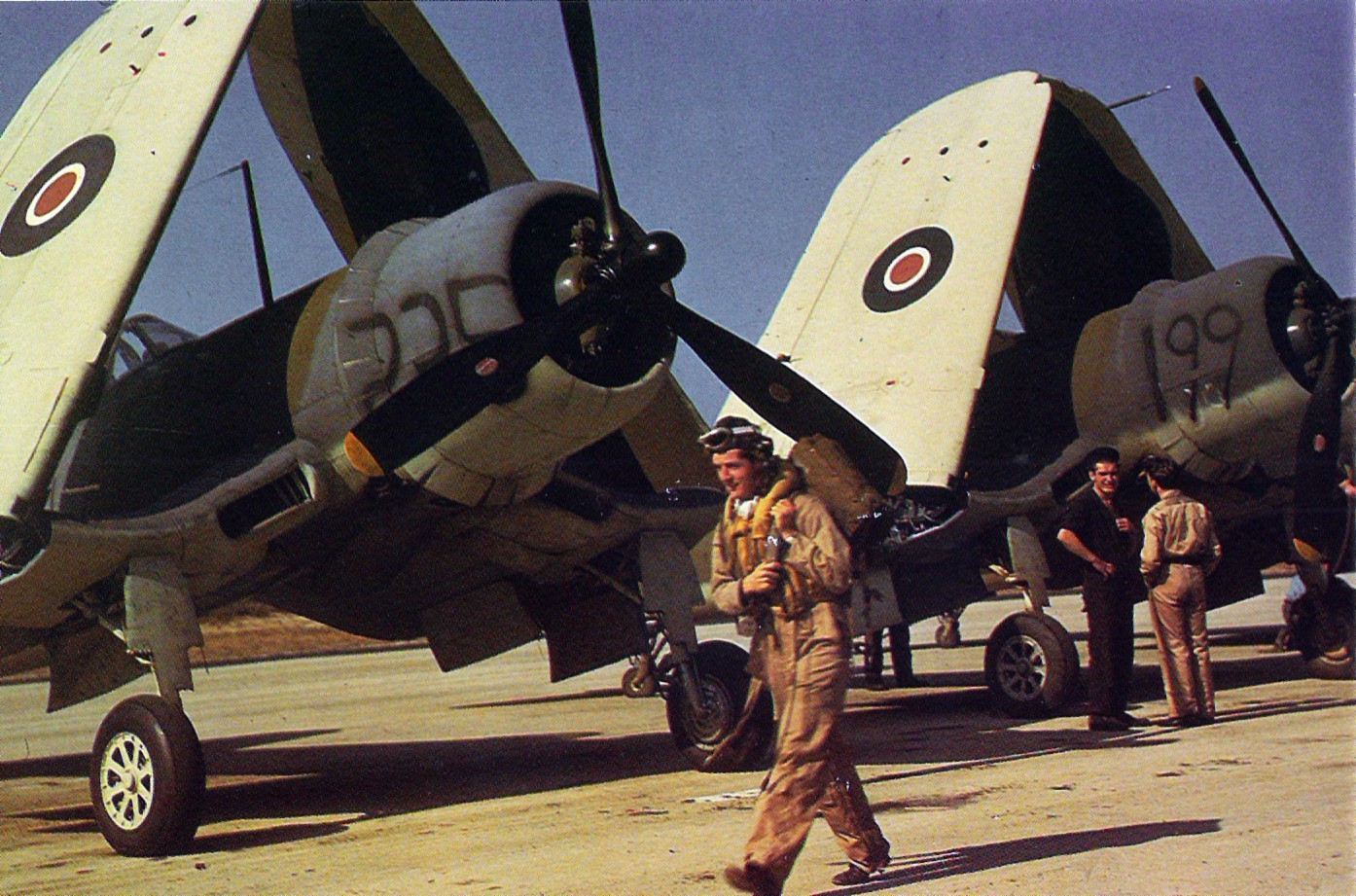
FAA Corsair Is at NAS Quonset Point, 1943.

In the early days of World War II, Royal Navy fighter requirements had been based on cumbersome two-seat designs, such as the fighter/dive-bomber Blackburn Skua (and its turreted derivative the Blackburn Roc) and the fighter/reconnaissance Fairey Fulmar, since it was expected that they would encounter only long-range bombers or flying boats; that navigation over featureless seas required the assistance of a radio operator/navigator. (Note: There were also some Sea Gladiator biplane fighters in use) The Royal Navy hurriedly adopted higher-performance single-seat aircraft such as the Hawker Sea Hurricane and the less robust Supermarine Seafire alongside. Still, neither aircraft had sufficient range to operate at a distance from a carrier task force. The Corsair was welcomed as a more robust and versatile alternative.

In mid 1943, the Royal Navy received its first batch of 95 Vought F4U-1s, which were given the designation "Corsair [Mark] I". The first squadrons were assembled and trained on the U.S. East Coast and then shipped across the Atlantic. The Royal Navy put the Corsair into carrier operations immediately. They found its landing characteristics dangerous, with many fatal crashes, but considered the Corsair the best option they had.

In Royal Navy service, because of the limited hangar deck height in several classes of British carrier, many Corsairs had their outer wings "clipped" by 8 in (200 mm) to clear the deckhead. The change in span brought about the added benefit of increasing the sink rate, reducing the F4U's propensity to "float" in the final stages of landing.

The Royal Navy developed several modifications to the Corsair that made carrier landings more practical. Among these were a bulged canopy (similar to the Malcolm Hood), raising the pilot's seat 7 in (180 mm), and wiring shut the cowl flaps across the top of the engine compartment, diverting oil and hydraulic fluid spray around the sides of the fuselage. The curved approach used with the Seafire was also adopted for landing Corsairs, ensuring the flight deck was kept in sight as long as possible.

===== Deployment =====
The Royal Navy initially received 95 "birdcage" F4U-1s from Vought, which were designated Corsair Mk I in Fleet Air Arm service. Next from Vought came 510 "blown-canopy" F4U-1A/-1Ds, which were designated Corsair Mk II (the final 150 equivalent to the F4U-1D, but not separately designated in British use). 430 Brewster Corsairs (334 F3A-1 and 96 F3A-1D), more than half of Brewster's total production, were delivered to Britain as the Corsair Mk III. 857 Goodyear Corsairs (400 FG-1/-1A and 457 FG-1D) were delivered and designated Corsair Mk IV. The Mk IIs and Mk IVs were the only versions to be used in combat.

The Royal Navy cleared the F4U for carrier operations well before the U.S. Navy and showed that the Corsair Mk II could be operated with reasonable success even from escort carriers. It was not without problems; one was excessive wear of the arrester wires, due both to the weight of the Corsair and the understandable tendency of the pilots to stay well above the stalling speed. A total of 2,012 Corsairs were supplied to the United Kingdom.

Fleet Air Arm (FAA) units were created and equipped in the United States, at Quonset Point or Brunswick and then shipped to war theaters aboard escort carriers. The first FAA Corsair unit was 1830 NAS, created on the first of June 1943, and soon operating from HMS Illustrious. At the end of the war, 18 FAA squadrons were operating the Corsair. British Corsairs served both in Europe and in the Pacific. The first, and also most important, European operations were the series of attacks (Operation Tungsten) in April, July, and August 1944 on the German battleship Tirpitz, for which Corsairs from HMS Victorious and HMS Formidable provided fighter cover. It appears the Corsairs did not encounter aerial opposition on these raids.

From April 1944, Corsairs from the British Pacific Fleet took part in several major air raids in South East Asia beginning with Operation Cockpit, an attack on Japanese targets at Sabang island, in the Dutch East Indies.

In July and August 1945, Corsair naval squadrons 1834, 1836, 1841, and 1842 took part in a series of strikes on the Japanese mainland, near Tokyo. These squadrons operated from Victorious and Formidable. On 9 August 1945, days before the end of the war, Corsairs from Formidable attacked Shiogama harbor on the northeast coast of Japan. Royal Canadian Navy Volunteer Reserve pilot, Lieutenant Robert Hampton Gray, of 1841 Squadron, was hit by flak but pressed home his attack on the Japanese destroyer escort Amakusa, sinking it with a 1,000 lb (450 kg) bomb but crashing into the sea. He was posthumously awarded Canada's last Victoria Cross, becoming the second fighter pilot of the war to earn it and the final Canadian casualty of World War II. (Note: Although P/O Andrew Mynarski's Victoria Cross was actually awarded in 1946, it commemorated an action in 1944.)

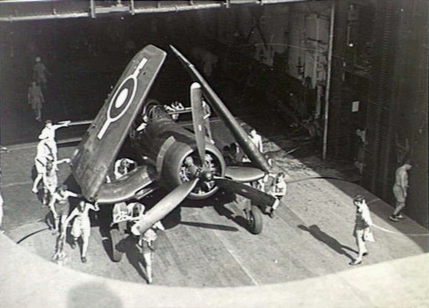
1831 NAS Corsair aboard HMS Glory, off Rabaul, 1945, with added "bars" based on their 28 June 1943 adoption by the U.S. Navy

FAA Corsairs originally fought in a camouflage scheme with a Dark Slate Grey/Extra Dark Sea Grey disruptive pattern on top and Sky undersides, but were later painted overall dark blue. As it had become imperative for all Allied aircraft in the Pacific Theater of World War II to abandon all use of any "red devices" in their national insignia — to prevent any chance of misidentification with Japanese military aircraft, all of which bore the circular, all-red Hinomaru insignia (nicknamed a "meatball" by Allied aircrew) that is still in use to this day, the United States removed all areas of red color (specifically removing the red center to the roundel) and removed any sort of national fin/rudder markings, which at that time had seven horizontal red stripes, from the American national aircraft insignia scheme by 6 May 1942. The British did likewise, starting with a simple white paintover of the red center of their "Type C" roundel, at about the time the U.S. Navy removed the red center from its roundel. Later, a shade of slate gray for the center color replaced the white on the earlier roundel. When the Americans started using the added white bars to either side of their blue/white star roundel on 28 June 1943, SEAC British Corsairs, most of which still used the earlier blue/white Type C roundel with the red center removed, added similar white bars to either side of their blue-white roundels to emulate the Americans.

In all, out of 18 carrier-based squadrons, eight saw combat, flying intensive ground attack/interdiction operations and claiming 47.5 aircraft shot down.

At the end of World War II, under the terms of the Lend-Lease agreement, the aircraft had to be paid for or returned to the U.S. As the UK did not have the means to pay for them, the Royal Navy Corsairs were pushed overboard into the sea in Moreton Bay off Brisbane, Australia.

==== Royal New Zealand Air Force ====
Equipped with obsolescent Curtiss P-40s, Royal New Zealand Air Force (RNZAF) squadrons in the South Pacific performed impressively, in particular in the air-to-air role. The American government accordingly decided to grant New Zealand early access to the Corsair, especially since carriers did not initially use it. In addition, as the war moved up the island chain, the RNZAF moved from the US Army Air Corps zone to the US Navy zone, reporting to Chester Nimitz and relying on US Navy supply lines, which made the P40 unworkable. Some 424 Corsairs equipped 13 RNZAF squadrons, including No. 14 Squadron RNZAF and No. 15 Squadron RNZAF, replacing Douglas SBD Dauntlesses as well as P-40s. Most of the F4U-1s (Note: Although these are often called F4U-1As, apparently this was not an official wartime designation but was one applied postwar to indicate that there were production line modifications. The same comment applies to the -1B.) were assembled by Unit 60 with a further batch assembled and flown at RNZAF Station Hobsonville. In total, there were 336 F4U-1s and 41 F4U-1Ds used by the RNZAF during the Second World War. Sixty FG-1Ds arrived late in the war.

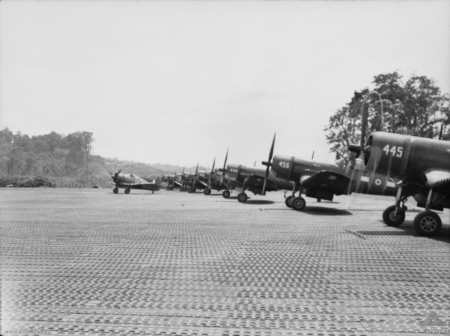
RNZAF Corsairs with a Royal Australian Air Force CAC Boomerang on Bougainville, 1945.

The first deliveries of lend-lease Corsairs began in March 1944 with the arrival of 30 F4U-1s at the RNZAF Base Depot Workshops (Unit 60) on the island of Espiritu Santo in the New Hebrides. From April, these workshops became responsible for assembling all Corsairs for the RNZAF units operating the aircraft in the South West Pacific, and a Test and Despatch flight was set up to test the aircraft after assembly. By June 1944, 100 Corsairs had been assembled and test flown. The first squadrons to use the Corsair were 20 and 21 Squadrons on Espiritu Santo, operational in May 1944. The organization of the RNZAF in the Pacific and New Zealand meant that only the pilots and a small staff belonged to each squadron (the maximum strength on a squadron was 27 pilots): squadrons were assigned to several Servicing Units (SUs, composed of 5–6 officers, 57 NCOs, 212 airmen) which carried out aircraft maintenance and operated from fixed locations: hence F4U-1 NZ5313 was first used by 20 Squadron/1 SU on Guadalcanal in May 1944; 20 Squadron was then relocated to 2 SU on Bougainville in November. In all, there were ten front-line SUs plus another three based in New Zealand. Because each of the SUs painted its aircraft with distinctive markings and the aircraft themselves could be repainted in several different color schemes, the RNZAF Corsairs were far less uniform in appearance than their American and FAA contemporaries. By late 1944, the F4U had equipped all ten Pacific-based fighter squadrons of the RNZAF.

By the time the Corsairs arrived, there were very few Japanese aircraft left in New Zealand's allocated sectors of the Southern Pacific. Despite RNZAF squadrons extending their operations to more northern islands, they were primarily used to provide close support to American, Australian, and New Zealand soldiers fighting the Japanese. At the end of 1945, all Corsair squadrons but one (No. 14) were disbanded. That last squadron was based in Japan until the Corsair was retired from service in 1947.

No. 14 Squadron was given new FG-1Ds and in March 1946 transferred to Iwakuni, Japan as part of the British Commonwealth Occupation Force. Only one airworthy example of the 437 aircraft procured survives: FG-1D NZ5648/ZK-COR, owned by the Old Stick and Rudder Company at Masterton, New Zealand.

==== Captured Corsairs ====
On 18 July 1944, a British Corsair (serial JT404) of 1841 Naval Air Squadron was involved in an anti-submarine patrol from HMS Formidable as it returned to Scapa Flow after the Operation Mascot attack on the German battleship Tirpitz. It flew in company with a Fairey Barracuda. Due to technical problems, the Corsair made an emergency landing in a field in Hamarøy Municipality north of Bodø, Norway. The pilot, Lt Mattholie, was taken prisoner, and the aircraft was captured undamaged. Luftwaffe interrogators failed to get the pilot to explain how to fold the wings to transport the aircraft to Narvik. The Corsair was ferried by boat for further investigation. Later, the Corsair was taken to Germany and listed as one of the captured enemy aircraft (Beuteflugzeug) based at Erprobungsstelle Rechlin, the central German military aviation test facility and the equivalent of the Royal Aircraft Establishment for 1944, under repair. This was probably the only Corsair captured by the Germans.

In 1945, Japanese forces captured an F4U Corsair near the Kasumigaura flight school. The Japanese had repaired it by covering damaged parts on the wing with fabric and using spare parts from crashed F4Us. It seems Japan captured two force-landed Corsairs fairly late in the war and may have tested one in flight. (Note: A photograph exists of an F4U-1 being examined on the ground by Japanese airmen.)

=== Korean War ===
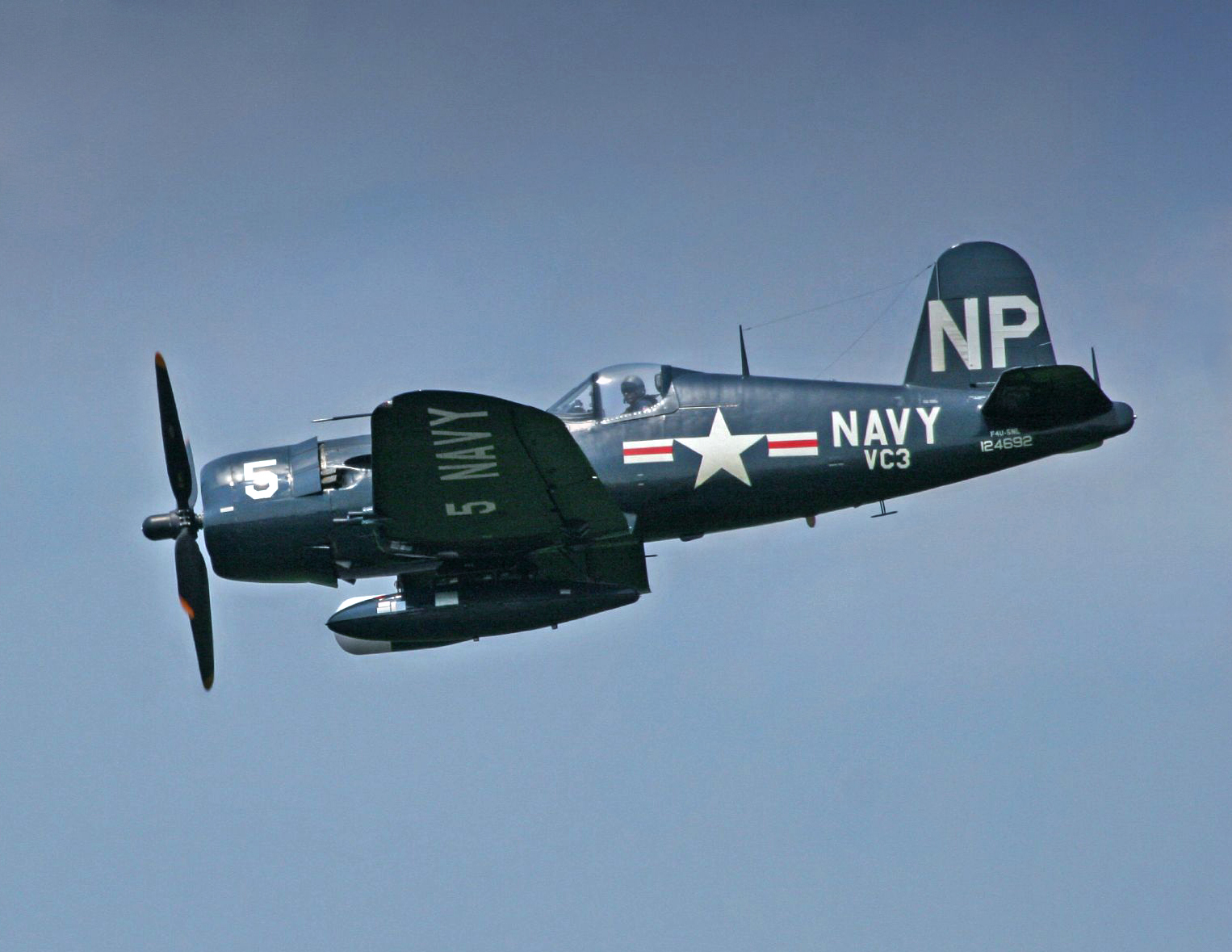
A United States Navy F4U-5NL Corsair equipped with the air intercept radar (right wing) and a 154-gallon drop tank in the Geneseo Airshow, on 9 July 2006

During the Korean War, the Corsair was used mostly in the close-support role. The AU-1 Corsair was developed from the F4U-5 and was a ground-attack version which normally operated at low altitudes: as a consequence, the Pratt & Whitney R-2800-83W engine used a single-stage, manually controlled supercharger, rather than the two-stage automatic supercharger of the -5. The versions of the Corsair used in Korea from 1950 to 1953 were the AU-1, F4U-4B, -4P, and -5N and -5NL. There were dogfights between F4Us and Soviet-built Yakovlev Yak-9 fighters early in the war, but when the enemy introduced the Mikoyan-Gurevich MiG-15, the Corsair was outmatched. On 10 September 1952, a MiG-15 made the mistake of getting into a turning contest with a Corsair piloted by Marine Captain Jesse G. Folmar, with Folmar shooting the MiG down with his four 20 mm cannon. In turn, four MiG-15s shot down Folmar minutes later; Folmar bailed out and was quickly rescued with little injury.

F4U-5N and -5NL Corsair night fighters were used to attack enemy supply lines, including truck convoys and trains, as well as interdicting night attack aircraft such as the Polikarpov Po-2 "Bedcheck Charlies", which were used to harass United Nations forces at night. The F4Us often operated with the help of C-47 'flare ships' which dropped hundreds of 1,000,000 candlepower magnesium flares to illuminate the targets. For many operations, detachments of U.S. Navy F4U-5Ns were posted to shore bases. The leader of one such unit, Lieutenant Guy Bordelon of VC-3 Det D (Detachment D), off USS Princeton, became the Navy's only ace in the war, in addition to being the only American ace in Korea that used a piston-engined aircraft. Bordelon, nicknamed "Lucky Pierre", was credited with three Lavochkin La-9s or La-11s and two Yakovlev Yak-18s between 29 June and 16/17 July 1952. Navy and Marine Corsairs were credited with a total of 12 enemy aircraft.

More generally, Corsairs performed attacks with cannons, napalm tanks, various iron bombs, and unguided rockets. The 5 inch HVAR was a reliable standby; sturdy Soviet-built armor proved resistant to the HVAR's punch, which led to a new 6.5 in (17 cm) shaped charge antitank warhead being developed. The result was called the "Anti-Tank Aircraft Rocket (ATAR)." The 11 in (28 cm) "Tiny Tim" was also used in combat, with two under the belly.

Lieutenant Thomas J. Hudner, Jr., flying an F4U-4 of VF-32 off USS Leyte, was awarded the Medal of Honor for crash landing his Corsair in an attempt to rescue his squadron mate, Ensign Jesse L. Brown, whose aircraft had been forced down by antiaircraft fire near Changjin. Brown, who did not survive the incident, was one of the U.S. Navy's first African American naval aviators.

=== Aéronavale ===
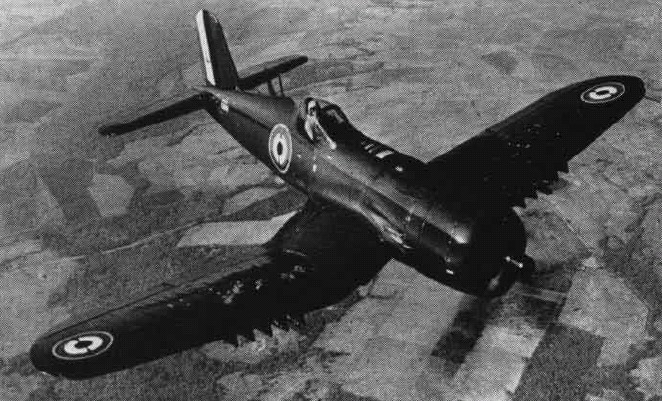
Early F4U-7 Corsair in flight in black and white with the former flashes of the French Naval Aviation

After the war, the French Navy had an urgent requirement for a powerful carrier-borne close-air-support aircraft to operate from its four aircraft carriers acquired in the late 1940s (two former U.S. Navy and two Royal Navy carriers were transferred). Secondhand US Navy Douglas SBD Dauntless dive-bombers of Flotille 3F and 4F were used to attack enemy targets and support ground forces in the First Indochina War. Former US Grumman F6F-5 Hellcats and Curtiss SB2C Helldivers were also used for close air support. A new and more capable aircraft was needed.

==== First Indochina War ====
The last production Corsair was the 'F4U-7, which was built specifically for the French naval air arm, the Aéronavale. The XF4U-7 prototype did its test flight on 2 July 1952 with a total of 94 F4U-7s built for the French Navy's Aéronavale (79 in 1952, 15 in 1953), with the last of the batch, the final Corsair built, rolled out on 31 January 1953. The F4U-7s were actually purchased by the U.S. Navy and passed on to the Aéronavale through the U.S. Military Assistance Program (MAP). The French Navy used its F4U-7s during the second half of the First Indochina War in the 1950s (12.F, 14.F, 15.F Flotillas), where at least 25 ex-USMC AU-1s supplemented them passed on to the French in 1954, after the end of the Korean War.

On 15 January 1953, Flotille 14F, based at Karouba Air Base near Bizerte in Tunisia, became the first Aéronavale unit to receive the F4U-7 Corsair. Flotille 14F pilots arrived at Da Nang, Vietnam on 17 April 1954, but without their aircraft. The next day, the carrier USS Saipan delivered 25 war-weary ground attack ex-USMC AU-1 Corsairs (flown by VMA-212 at the end of the Korean War) to Tourane Air Base. During three months operating over Vietnam (including in support of the Battle of Dien Bien Phu), the Corsairs flew 959 combat sorties totaling 1,335 flight hours. They dropped some 700 tons of bombs and fired more than 300 rockets and 70,000 20 mm rounds. Six aircraft were damaged and two shot down by Viet Minh.

In September 1954, F4U-7 Corsairs were loaded aboard Dixmude and brought back to France in November. The surviving Ex-USMC AU-1s were taken to the Philippines and returned to the U.S. Navy. In 1956, Flotille 15F returned to South Vietnam, equipped with F4U-7 Corsairs.

==== Suez Crisis ====
The 14.F and 15.F Flotillas also took part in the Anglo-French-Israeli seizure of the Suez Canal in October 1956, code-named Operation Musketeer. The Corsairs were painted with yellow-and-black recognition stripes for this operation. They were tasked with destroying Egyptian Navy ships at Alexandria, but the presence of U.S. Navy ships prevented the successful completion of the mission. On 3 November 16, F4U-7s attacked airfields in the Delta, with one Corsair shot down by anti-aircraft fire. Two more Corsairs were damaged when landing back on the carriers. The Corsairs engaged in Operation Musketeer dropped a total of 25 tons of bombs, and fired more than 500 rockets and 16,000 20mm rounds.

==== Algerian War ====
As soon as they disembarked from the carriers that took part in Operation Musketeer, at the end of 1956, all three Corsair Flotillas moved to Telergma and Oran airfields in Algeria, from where they provided CAS and helicopter escort. They were joined by the new "Flottille 17F", established at Hyères in April 1958.

French F4U-7 Corsairs (with some borrowed AU-1s) of the 12F, 14F, 15F, and 17F Flotillas conducted missions during the Algerian War between 1955 and 1962. Between February and March 1958, several strikes and CAS missions were launched from Bois Belleau, the only carrier involved in the Algerian War.

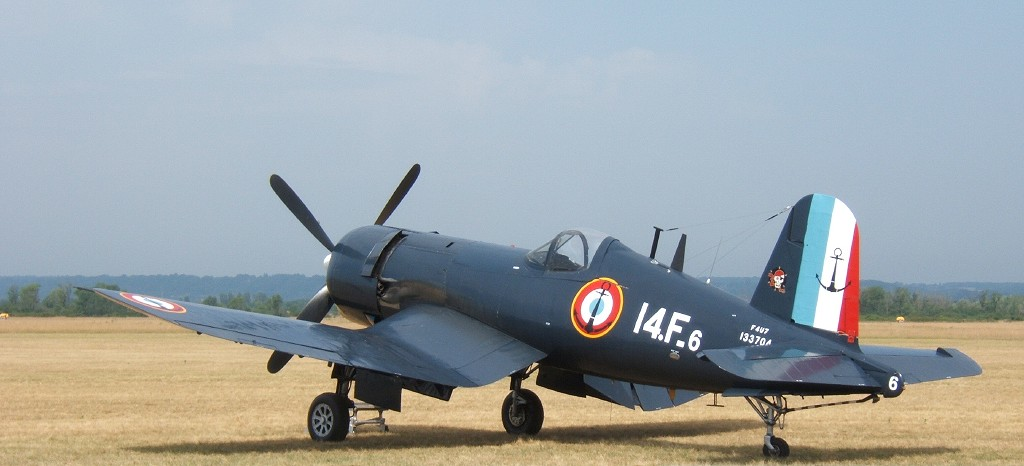
Former Argentine F4U-5NL in Aeronavale 14.F flotilla colors in 2006

==== Tunisia ====
France recognized Tunisian independence and sovereignty in 1956, but continued to station military forces at Bizerte and planned to extend the airbase. In 1961, Tunisia asked France to evacuate the base. Tunisia imposed a blockade on the base on 17 July, hoping to force its evacuation. This resulted in a three-day battle between militiamen and the French military. French paratroopers, escorted by Corsairs of the 12F and 17F Flotillas, were dropped to reinforce the base, and the Aéronavale launched air strikes on Tunisian troops and vehicles between 19 and 21 July, carrying out more than 150 sorties. Three Corsairs were damaged by ground fire.

==== French experiments ====
In early 1959, the Aéronavale experimented with the Vietnam War-era SS.11 wire-guided anti-tank missile on F4U-7 Corsairs. The 12.F pilots trained for this experimental program were required to manually pilot the missile at approximatively two kilometers from the target on low altitude with a joystick using the right hand while keeping track of a flare on its tail, and piloting the aircraft using the left hand; an exercise that could be very tricky in a single-seat aircraft under combat conditions. Despite reportedly effective results during the tests, this armament was not used with Corsairs during the ongoing Algerian War.

The Aéronavale used 163 Corsairs (94 F4U-7s and 69 AU-1s), the last of them used by the Cuers-based 14.F Flotilla were out of service by September 1964, with some surviving for museum display or as civilian warbirds. By the early 1960s, two new modern aircraft carriers, Clemenceau and Foch, had entered service with the French Navy and with them a new generation of jet-powered combat aircraft.

=== "Football War" ===
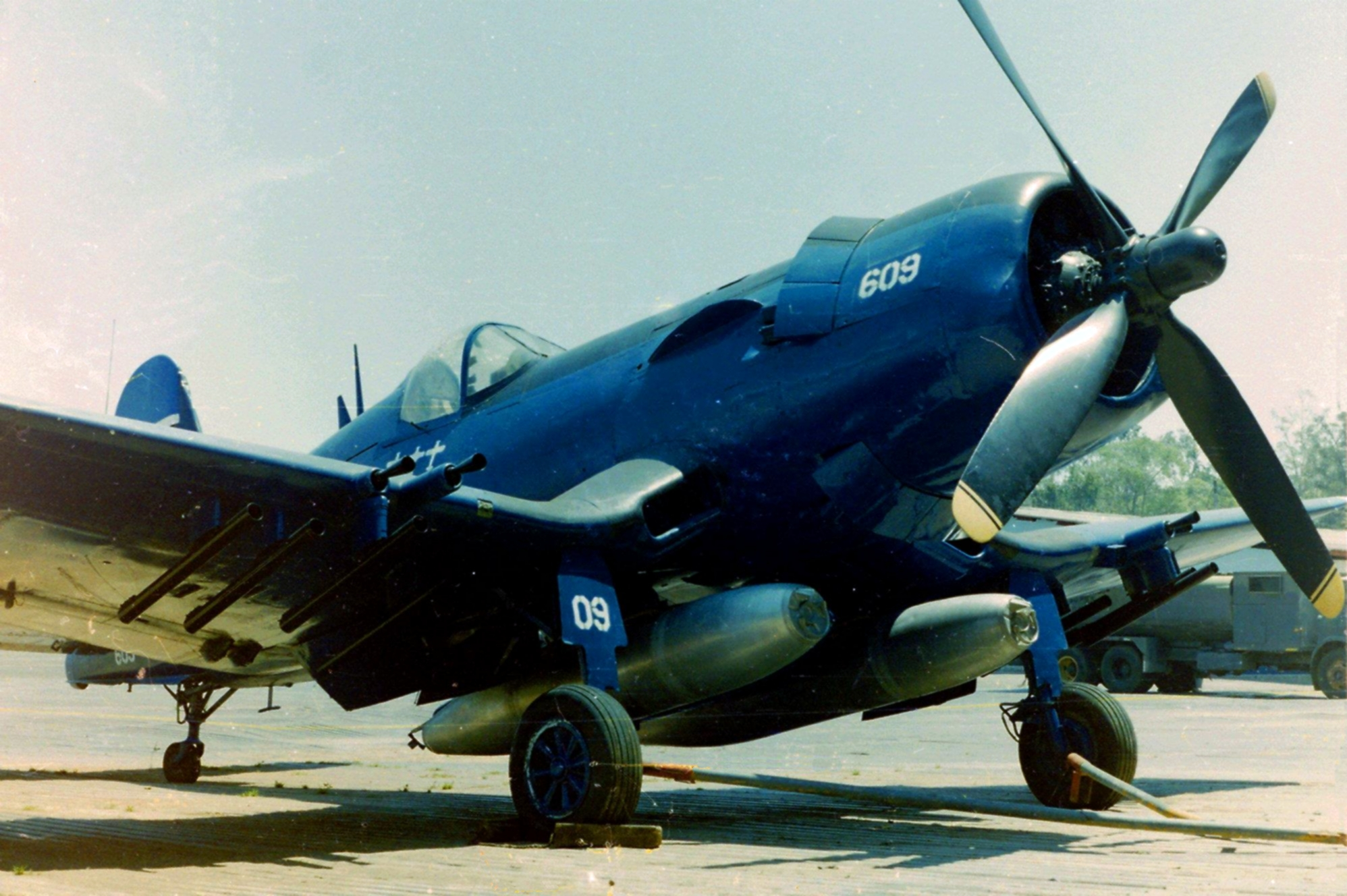
Honduran Air Force Vought F4U-5NL No. FAH-609 Corsair flown by Cap. Fernando Soto, when he shot down three Salvadoran Air Force planes.

Corsairs flew their final combat missions in 1969 during the "Football War" between Honduras and El Salvador, in service with both air forces. The conflict was allegedly triggered, though not really caused, by a disagreement over a soccer (association football) match. Captain Fernando Soto of the Honduran Air Force shot down three Salvadoran Air Force aircraft on 17 July 1969. In the morning, he shot down a Cavalier Mustang, killing the pilot. In the afternoon, he shot down two FG-1s; the pilot of the second aircraft may have bailed out, but the third aircraft exploded in the air, killing the pilot. These combats were the last among propeller-driven aircraft in the world and also made Soto the only pilot credited with three kills in an American continental war. El Salvador did not shoot down any Honduran aircraft. At the outset of the Football War, El Salvador enlisted the assistance of several American pilots with P-51 and F4U experience. Bob Love (a Korean War ace), Chuck Lyford, Ben Hall, and Lynn Garrison are believed to have flown combat missions, but it has never been confirmed. Lynn Garrison purchased F4U-7 133693 from the French MAAG office when it was retired from French naval service in 1964. It was registered N693M and was later destroyed in a 1987 crash in San Diego, California.

=== Legacy ===
The Corsair entered service in 1942. Although designed as a carrier fighter, initial operations from carrier decks proved troublesome. Its low-speed handling was tricky because the left wing stalled before the right. This factor, together with poor visibility over the long nose (leading to one of its nicknames, "The Hose Nose"), made landing a Corsair on a carrier a difficult task. For these reasons, most Corsairs initially went to Marine Corps squadrons which operated off land-based runways, with some early Goodyear-built examples (designated FG-1A) being built with fixed wings (Note: The wings were not actually "fixed". The hydraulic wing folding hardware was not installed. The wings could still be manually folded.). The USMC aviators welcomed the Corsair with open arms as its performance was far superior to the contemporary Brewster F2A Buffalo and Grumman F4F-3 and -4 Wildcat.

Moreover, the Corsair outperformed the primary Japanese fighter, the A6M Zero. While the Zero could outturn the F4U at low speed, the Corsair was faster and could outclimb and outdive the A6M.

This performance advantage, combined with the ability to take severe punishment, meant a pilot could place an enemy aircraft in the killing zone of the F4U's six .50 (12.7 mm) M2 Browning machine guns and keep him there long enough to inflict major damage. The 2,300 rounds carried by the Corsair gave just under 30 seconds of fire from each gun.

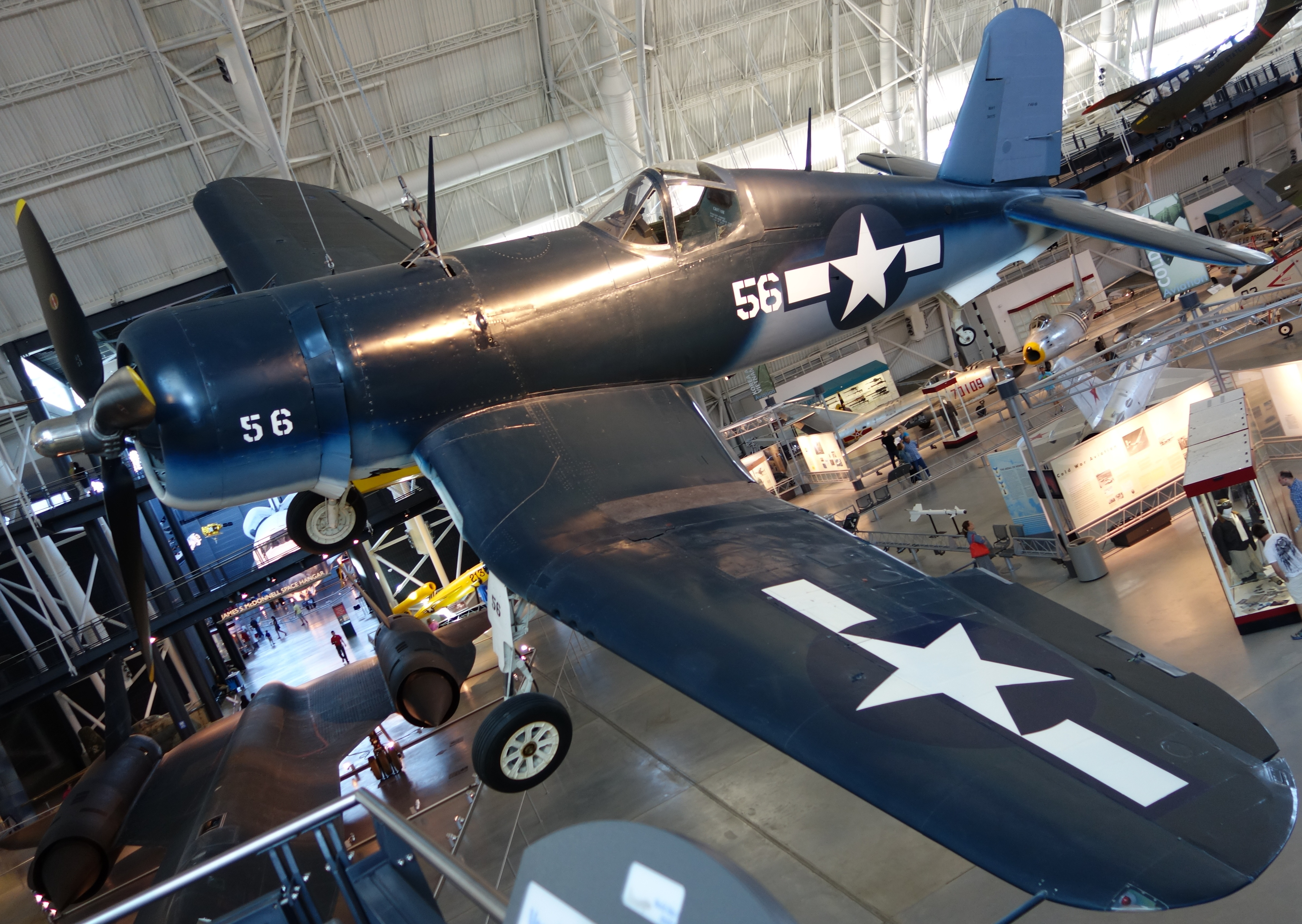
Corsair on display at the National Air and Space Museum, Steven F. Udvar-Hazy Center

Beginning in 1943, the Fleet Air Arm also received Corsairs and flew them successfully from Royal Navy carriers in combat with the British Pacific Fleet and in Norway. These were clipped-wing Corsairs, the wingtips shortened 8 in (20 cm) to clear the lower overhead height of RN carriers. FAA also developed a curving landing approach to overcome the F4U's deficiencies.

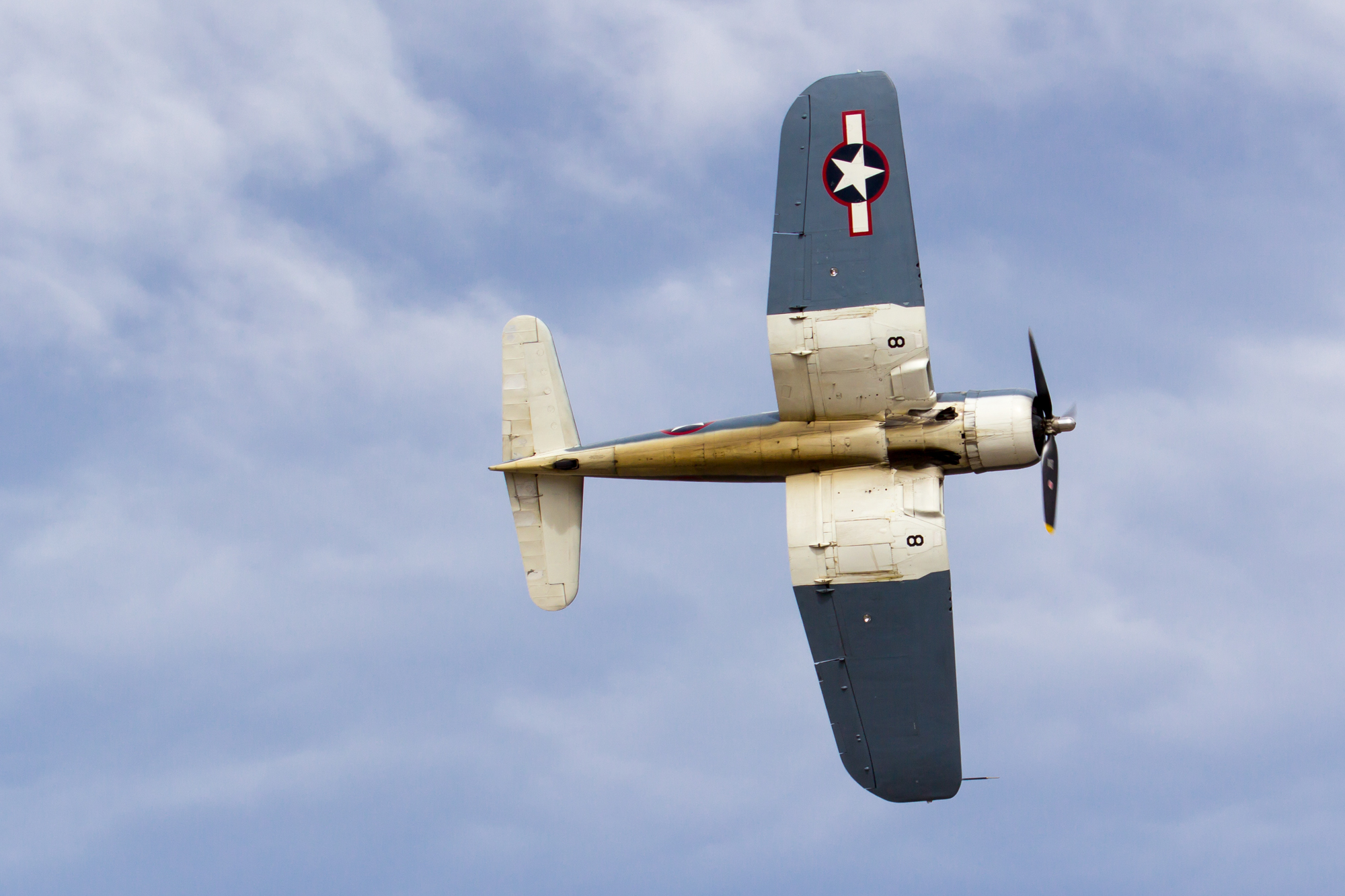
Underside of a Corsair

Infantrymen nicknamed the Corsair "The Sweetheart of the Marianas" and "The Angel of Okinawa" for its roles in these campaigns. Among Navy and Marine aviators, the aircraft was nicknamed "Ensign Eliminator" and "Bent-Wing Eliminator" because it required many more hours of flight training to master than other Navy carrier-borne aircraft. It was also called "U-bird" or "Bent Wing Bird". Although Allied World War II sources frequently make the claim that the Japanese called the Corsair the "Whistling Death", Japanese sources do not support this, and it was mainly known as the Sikorsky.

The Corsair has been named the official aircraft of Connecticut due to its multiple connections to Connecticut businesses, including the airframe manufacturer Vought-Sikorsky Aircraft, the engine manufacturer Pratt & Whitney, and the propeller manufacturer Hamilton Standard.

== Variants ==
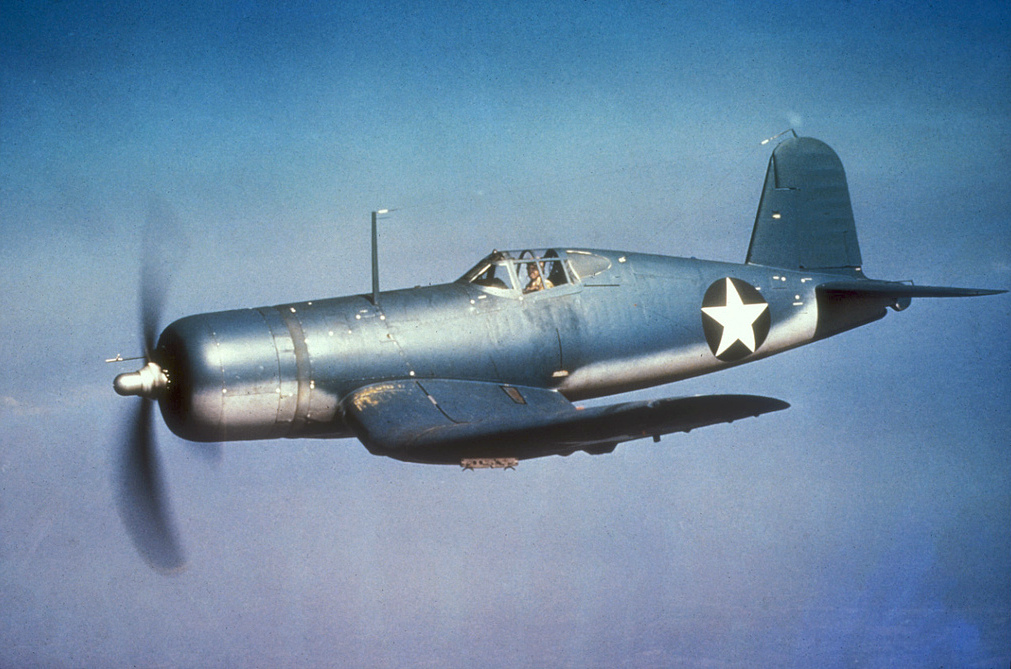
An early F4U-1 in flight.

During World War II, Corsair production expanded beyond Vought to include Brewster and Goodyear models. Allied forces flying the aircraft in World War II included the Fleet Air Arm and the Royal New Zealand Air Force. Eventually, more than 12,500 F4Us were built, comprising 16 separate variants.

Corsair variants
Make	Year	Variant	Number
Vought	1940	XF4U-1	1
Vought	1942	F4U-1	758
Vought	1942	F4U-1A	2,066
Vought	1942	F4U-1C	200
Vought	1944	F4U-1D	1,675
Vought	1944	XF4U-4	5
Vought	1944	F4U-4	2,351
Vought	1946	F4U-5	568
Vought	1952	F4U-6 / AU-1	111
Vought	1952	F4U-7	94
Brewster	1943	F3A-1	305
Brewster	1944	F3A-1D	430
Goodyear	1943	FG-1	1,704
Goodyear	1944	FG-1D	2,303
Goodyear	-	F2G-1	5
Goodyear	-	F2G-2	10
Total			12,586

F4U-1 (called Corsair Mk I by the Fleet Air Arm):

The first production version of the Corsair had the distinctive "birdcage" canopy and low seating position. (Note: A later version of this canopy incorporated a small rear-view mirror in a transparent blister.) The differences over the XF4U-1 were as follows:

- Six .50 in (12.7 mm) Browning AN/M2 machine guns were fitted in the outer wing panels, displacing fuel tanks.
- An enlarged 237 US gal (900 L) fuel tank was fitted ahead of the cockpit, in place of the fuselage armament. The cockpit was moved back by 32 in (810 mm).
- The fuselage was lengthened by 1 ft 5 in (0.43 m).
- The more powerful R-2800-8 Double Wasp was fitted.
- 150 pounds (68 kg) of armor plate was fitted to the cockpit, and a 1.5 in (38 mm) thick bullet-resistant glass panel was fitted behind the curved windscreen.
- IFF transponder equipment was fitted.
- Curved transparent panels were incorporated into the fuselage behind the pilot's headrest.
- The flaps were changed from deflector type to NACA slotted.
- The span of the ailerons was increased while that of the flaps was decreased.
- One 62 US gal (230 L) auxiliary fuel cell (not a self-sealing type) was installed in each wing leading edge, just outboard of the guns.

The Royal Navy's Fleet Air Arm received 95 Vought F4U-1s. These were all early "birdcage" Corsairs. Vought also built a single F4U-1 two-seat trainer; the Navy showed no interest.

F4U-1A (called Corsair Mk II by the Fleet Air Arm):

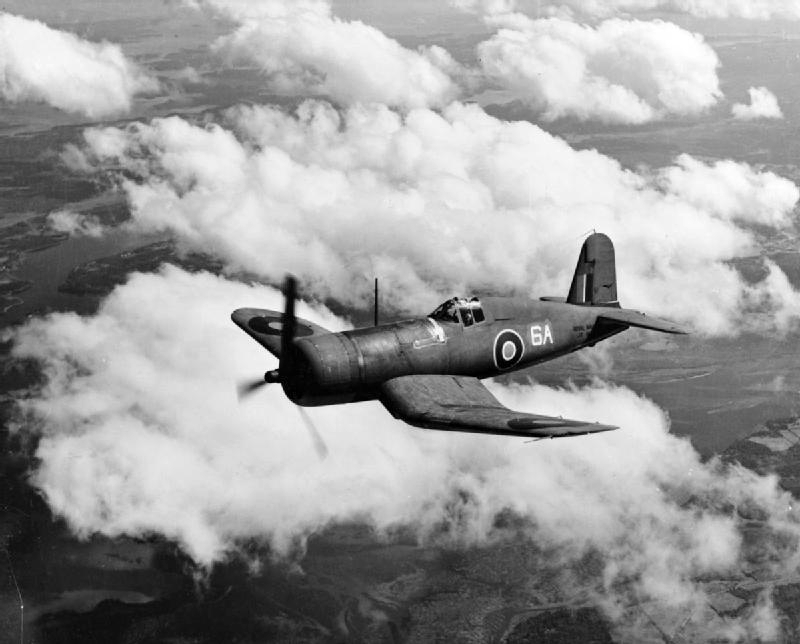
An F4U-1A in Fleet Air Arm service

Mid-to-late-production Corsairs incorporated a new, taller, wider canopy with only two frames — very close to the Malcolm hood fitted to some British fighter aircraft — along with a simplified windscreen; the new canopy design allowed the semi-elliptical turtledeck "flank" windows to be omitted. The designation F4U-1A, used to differentiate these Corsairs from earlier "birdcage" variants, was allowed for internal use by manufacturers. The pilot's seat was raised 7 in (180 mm), which, combined with the new canopy and a 6 in (150 mm) lengthening of the tailwheel strut, allowed the pilot better visibility over the long nose. In addition to these changes, the bombing window under the cockpit was omitted. These Corsairs introduced a 6 in (150 mm)-long stall strip just outboard of the gun ports on the right wing leading edge and improved undercarriage oleo struts, which eliminated bouncing on landing, making these the first truly "carrier capable" F4Us.

Three hundred and sixty F4U-1As were delivered to the Fleet Air Arm. In British service, they were modified with "clipped" wings (8 in (200 mm) was cut off each wingtip) for use on British aircraft carriers, although the Royal Navy had been successfully operating the Corsair Mk I since 1 June 1943 when 1830 Naval Air Squadron was commissioned and assigned to HMS Illustrious. F4U-1s in many USMC squadrons had their arrester hooks removed. (Note: Although F4Us operated by the Marines were seldom seen with folded wings, it did not mean that this facility was deactivated; the only version of the Corsair built without folding wings was some of those manufactured by Goodyear.) Additionally, an experimental R-2800-8W engine with water injection was fitted on one of the late F4U-1As. After satisfactory results were achieved, many F4U-1As were fitted with the new powerplant. The aircraft carried 237 US gal (900 L) in the main fuel tank, located in front of the cockpit, as well as an unarmored, non-self-sealing 62 US gal (230 L) fuel tank in each wing. This version of the Corsair was the first to carry a drop tank under the center section. With drop tanks fitted, the fighter had a maximum ferry range of just over 1,500 mi (2,400 km).

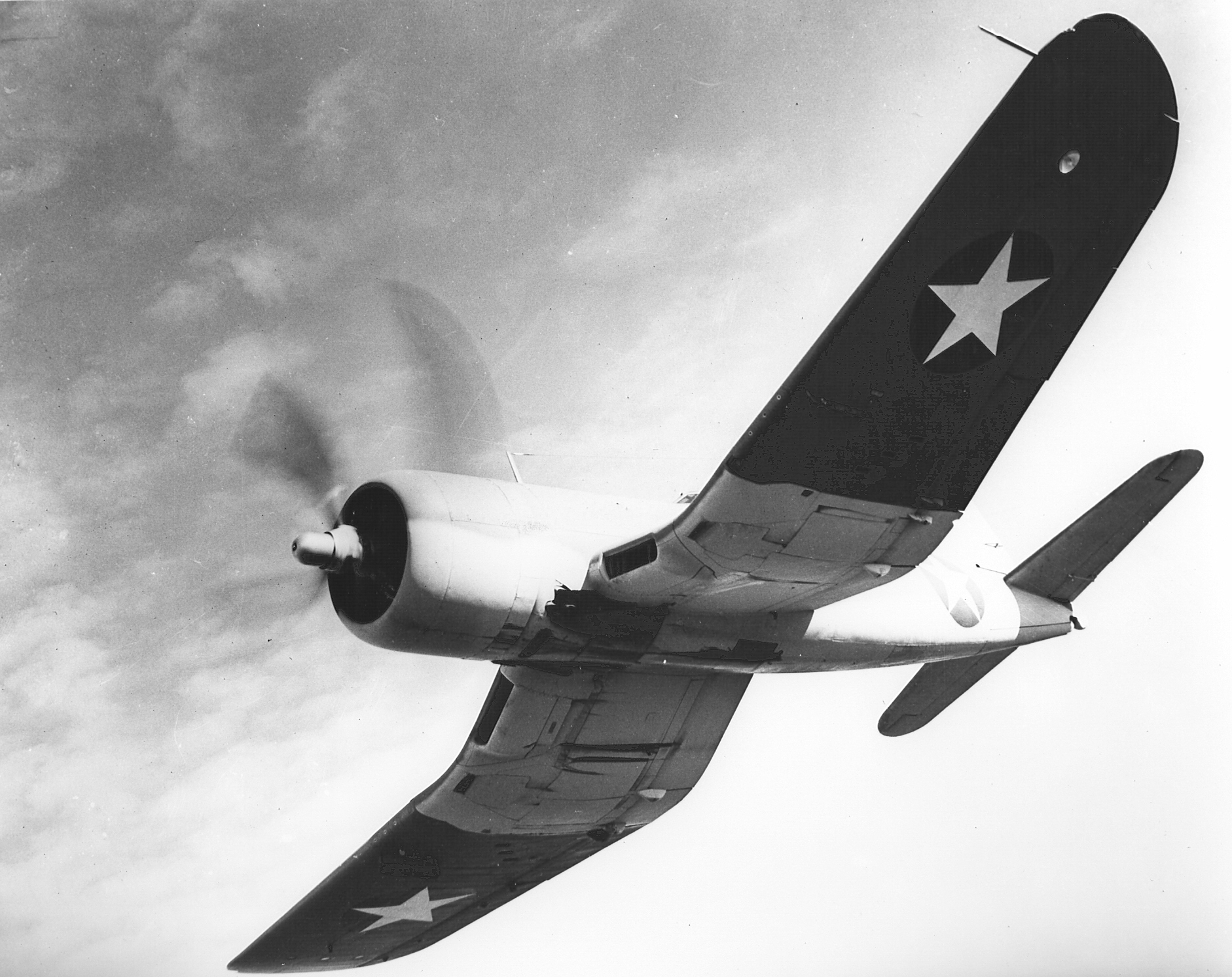
F3A-1

F3A-1 and F3A-1D (called Corsair Mk III by the Fleet Air Arm):

This was the designation for Brewster-built F4U-1. Labor troubles delayed production; the Navy terminated the company's contract, and Brewster folded soon after. Poor quality wing fittings meant that these aircraft were red-lined for speed and prohibited from aerobatics after several lost their wings. None of the Brewster-built Corsairs reached front-line units. 430 Brewster Corsairs (334 F3A-1 and 96 F3A-1D), more than half of Brewster's total production, were delivered to the Fleet Air Arm.

FG-1A and FG-1D (called Corsair Mk IV by the Fleet Air Arm):

This was the designation for Corsairs that were license-built by Goodyear, to the same specifications as Vought's Corsairs. The first Goodyear built FG-1 flew in February 1943 and Goodyear began delivery of FG-1 Corsairs in April 1943. The company continued production until the end of the war and delivered 4,007 FG-1 series Corsairs, including sixty FG-1Ds to the RNZAF and 857 (400 FG-1 and FG-1A, and 457 FG-1D) to the Royal Navy as Corsair Mk IVs.

F4U-1B: This was an unofficial post-war designation used to identify F4U-1s modified for Fleet Air Arm use.

F4U-1C:

The prototype F4U-1C appeared in August 1943 and was based on an F4U-1. A total of 200 of this variant were built from July to November 1944; all were based on the F4U-1D and were built in parallel with that variant. Intended for ground-attack as well as fighter missions, the F4U-1C was similar to the F4U-1D but its six machine guns were replaced by four 20 mm (0.79 in) AN/M2 cannons with 231 rounds of ammunition per gun. The F4U-1C was introduced to combat during 1945, most notably in the Okinawa campaign. The 20 mm firepower was highly appreciated. It was believed that the 20 mm cannon was more effective for all types of combat work than the .50 caliber machine gun. However, despite the superior firepower, many navy pilots preferred .50 caliber machine guns in air combat due to jam and freezing problems of the 20mm cannons. These problems were reduced as the ordnance crews gained experience until the performance of the guns compared favorably with the .50 caliber, but freezing problems remained at 25,000 to 30,000 ft (7,600 to 9,100 m) until gun heaters were installed.

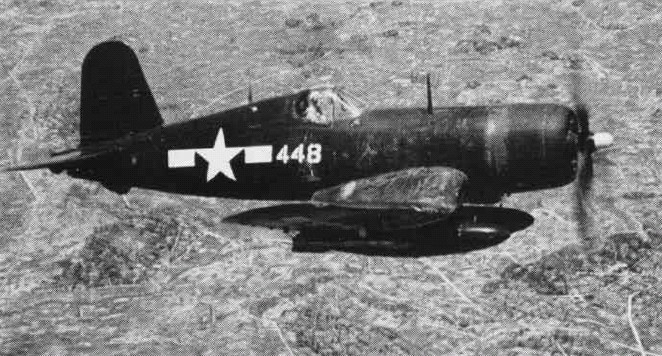
A Goodyear-built FG-1D, with the later single-piece "blown" canopy used by the F4U-1D.

F4U-1D (called Corsair Mk II by the Fleet Air Arm):

This variant was introduced in April 1944 and was built in parallel with the F4U-1C. It had the new R-2800-8W Double Wasp engine equipped with water injection. This change gave the aircraft up to 250 hp (190 kW) more power, which in turn improved performance. Speed was increased from 417 to 425 mph (671 to 684 km/h). Due to the U.S. Navy's need for fighter-bombers, it had a payload of rockets (twice that of the -1A) carried on permanent launching rails, as well as twin pylons for bombs or drop tanks. These modifications caused extra drag, but the additional fuel carried by the two drop tanks would still allow the aircraft to fly relatively long missions despite heavy, un-aerodynamic loads. A single piece "blown" clear-view canopy was adopted as standard equipment for the -1D model, and all later F4U production aircraft. 150 F4U-1D were delivered to the Fleet Air Arm.

F4U-1P: A rare photo reconnaissance variant.

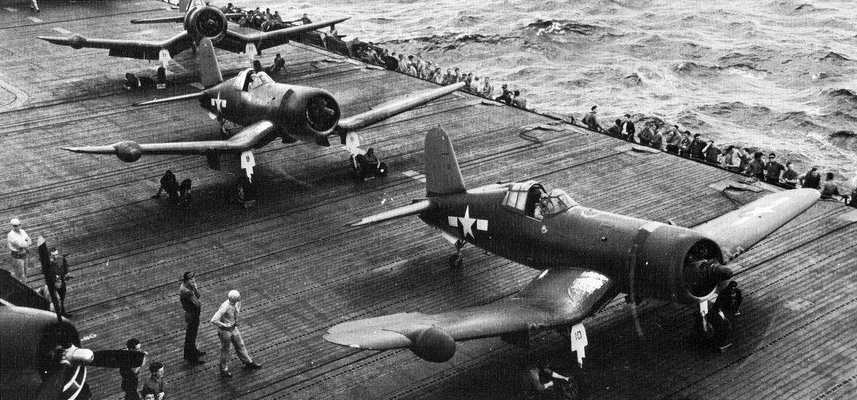
F4U-2s aboard USS Intrepid. The radome on the right outer wing is just visible.

XF4U-2: Special night fighter variant, equipped with two auxiliary fuel tanks.

F4U-2: Experimental conversion of the F4U-1 Corsair into a carrier-borne nightfighter, armed with five .50 in (12.7 mm) machine guns (the outboard, right gun was deleted), and fitted with Airborne Intercept (AI) radar set in a radome placed outboard on the starboard wing. Since Vought was preoccupied with more important projects, only 32 were converted from existing F4U-1s by the Naval Aircraft Factory and another two by front-line units. The type saw combat with VF(N)-101 aboard USS Enterprise and USS Intrepid in early 1944, VF(N)-75 in the Solomon Islands, and VMF(N)-532 on Tarawa.

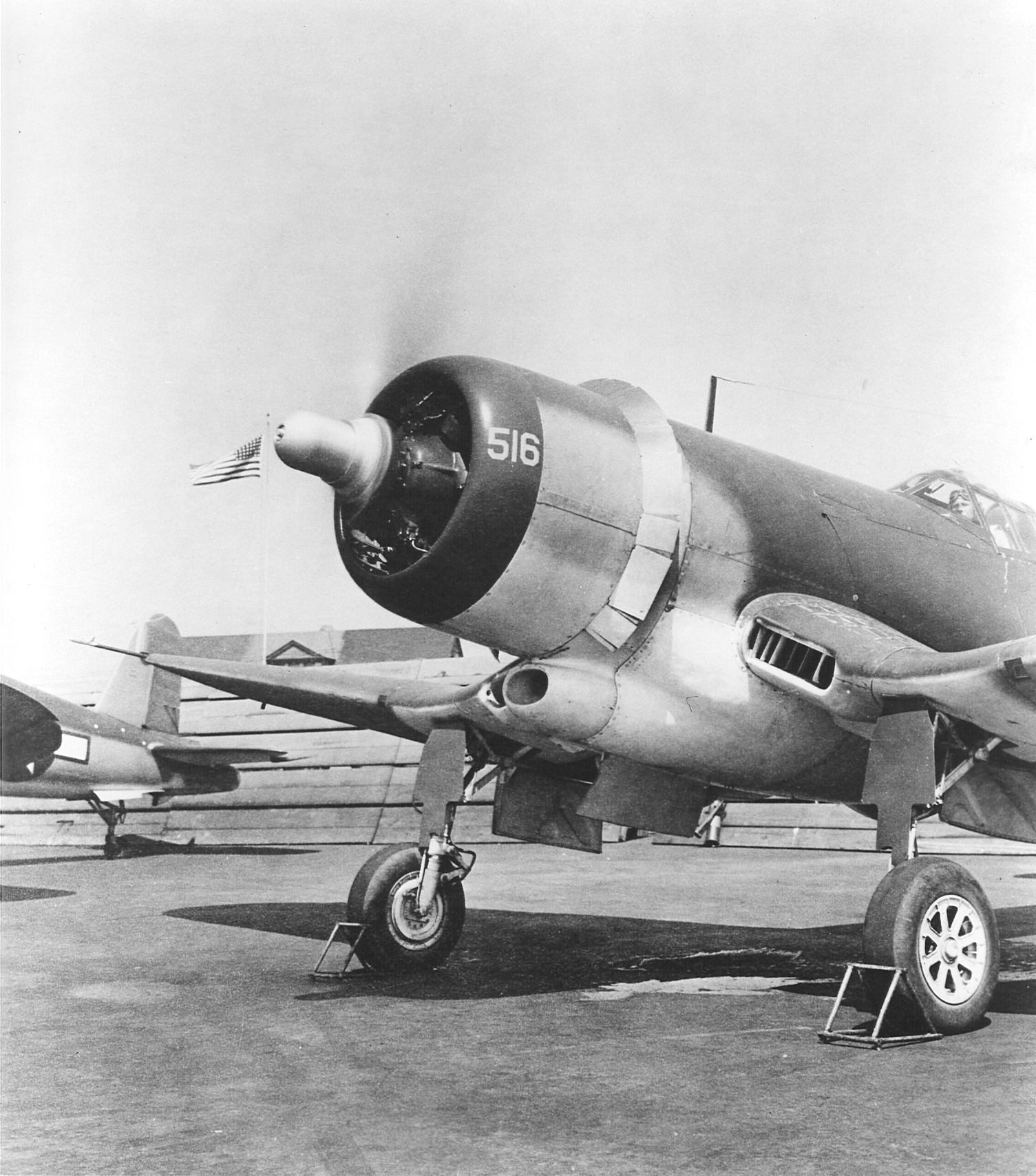
An XF4U-3 in 1946.

XF4U-3: Experimental aircraft built to hold different engines to test the Corsair's performance with a variety of power plants. This variant never entered service. Goodyear also contributed some airframes, designated FG-3, to the project. A single sub-variant XF4U-3B with minor modifications was also produced for the FAA.

XF4U-4: New engine and cowling.

F4U-4: The last variant to see action during World War II. Deliveries to the U.S. Navy of the F4U-4 began in early 1945. It had the 2,100 hp (1,600 kW) dual-stage-supercharged -18W engine. When the cylinders were injected with the water/alcohol mixture, power was boosted to 2,450 hp (1,830 kW). The aircraft required an air scoop under the nose, and the unarmored wing fuel tanks, with capacities of 62 US gal (230 L), were removed for better maneuverability at the expense of maximum range. The propeller was changed to a four-blade type. Maximum speed was increased to 448 miles per hour (721 km/h) and climb rate to over 4,500 feet per minute (1,400 m/min) as opposed to the 2,900 feet per minute (880 m/min) of the F4U-1A. The "4-Hog" retained the original armament and had all the external load (i.e., drop tanks, bombs) capabilities of the F4U-1D. Vought also tested the two F4U-4Xs (BuNos 49763 and 50301, prototypes for the new R2800) with fixed wingtip tanks (the Navy showed no interest) and an Aeroproducts six-blade contraprop (not accepted for production).

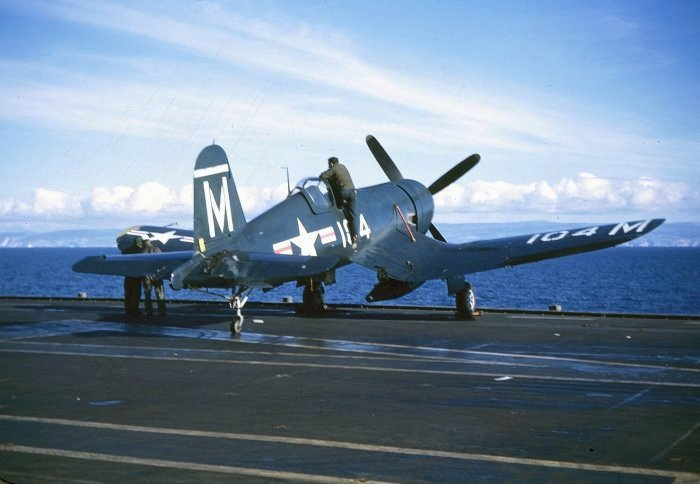
An F4U-4 of VF-1b on board USS Midway, 1947–1948. Four-bladed prop is shown.

F4U-4B: 300 F4U-4s ordered with alternate gun armament of four 20 millimetres (0.79 in) AN/M3 cannon.

F4U-4E and F4U-4N: Developed late in WWII, these nightfighters featured radar radomes projecting from the right wingtip. The -4E was fitted with the APS-4 search radar, while the -4N was fitted with the APS-6 type. In addition, these aircraft were often refitted with four 20 mm M2 cannons, similar to those on the F4U-1C. Though these variants would not see combat during WWII, the nightfighter variants would see great use during the Korean War.

F4U-4K: Experimental radio-controlled target drone variant (1 unit built).

F4U-4P: F4U-4 equivalent to the -1P, a rare photo reconnaissance variant.

XF4U-5: New engine cowling, other extensive changes.

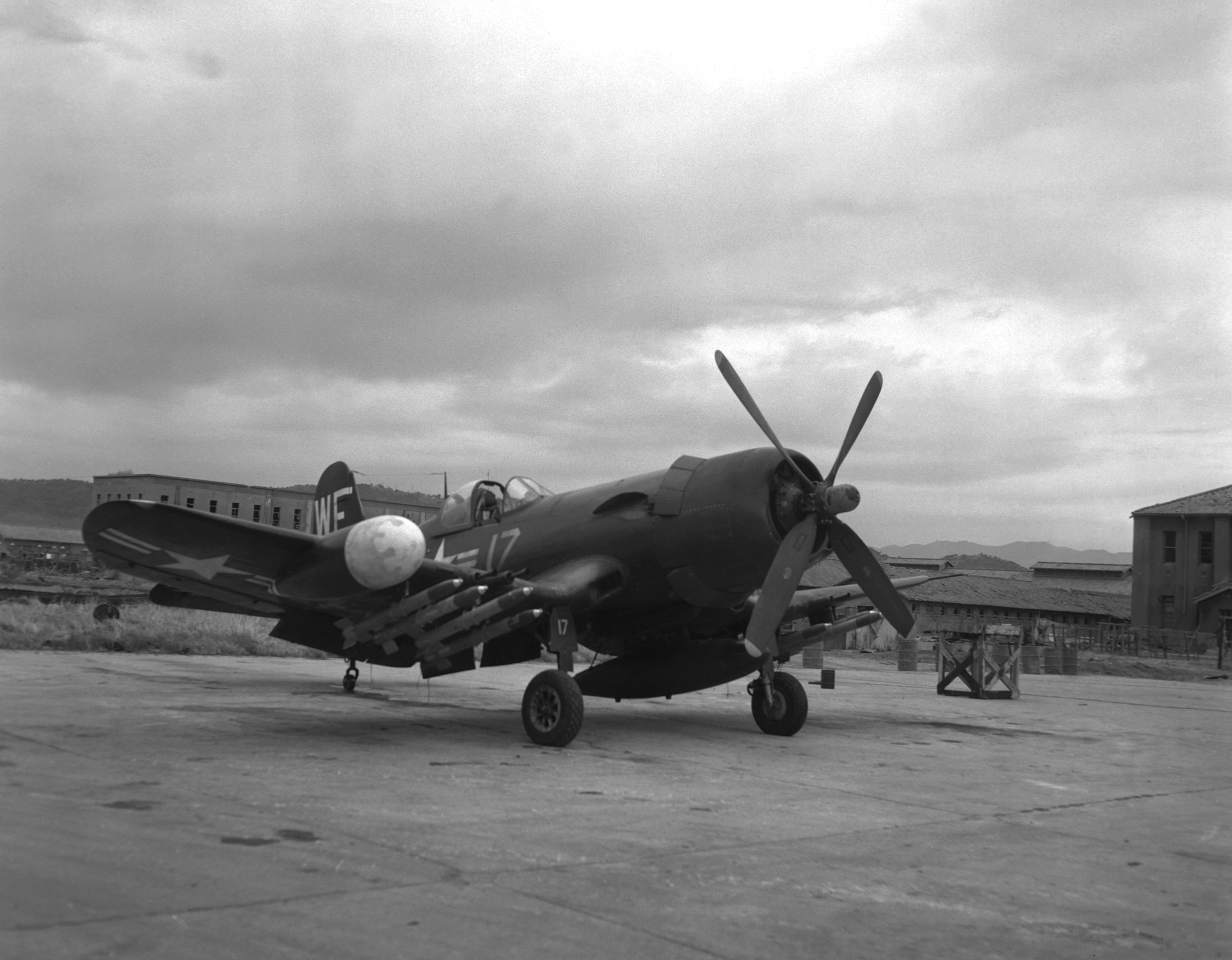
A VMF(N)-513 F4U-5N at Wonsan during the Korean War, 1950.

F4U-5: A 1945 design modification of the F4U-4, first flown on 21 December 1945, was intended to increase the F4U-4 Corsair's overall performance and incorporate many Corsair pilots' suggestions. It featured a more powerful Pratt and Whitney R-2800-32(E) engine with a two-stage supercharger, rated at a maximum of 2,760 hp (2,060 kW). Other improvements included automatic blower controls, cowl flaps, intercooler doors, and an engine oil cooler; spring tabs for the elevators and rudder; a completely modernized cockpit; a completely retractable tail wheel; and heated cannon bays and pitot head. The cowling was lowered two degrees to help with forward visibility, but perhaps most striking as the first variant to feature all-metal wings (223 units produced). Maximum speed was 408 knots (470 mph) and max rate of climb at sea level 4,850 feet per minute.

F4U-5N: Radar-equipped version (214 units produced)

F4U-5NL: Winterized version (72 units produced, 29 modified from F4U-5Ns (101 total)). Fitted with rubber de-icing boots on the leading edge of the wings and tail.

F4U-5P: Long-range photo-reconnaissance version (30 units produced)

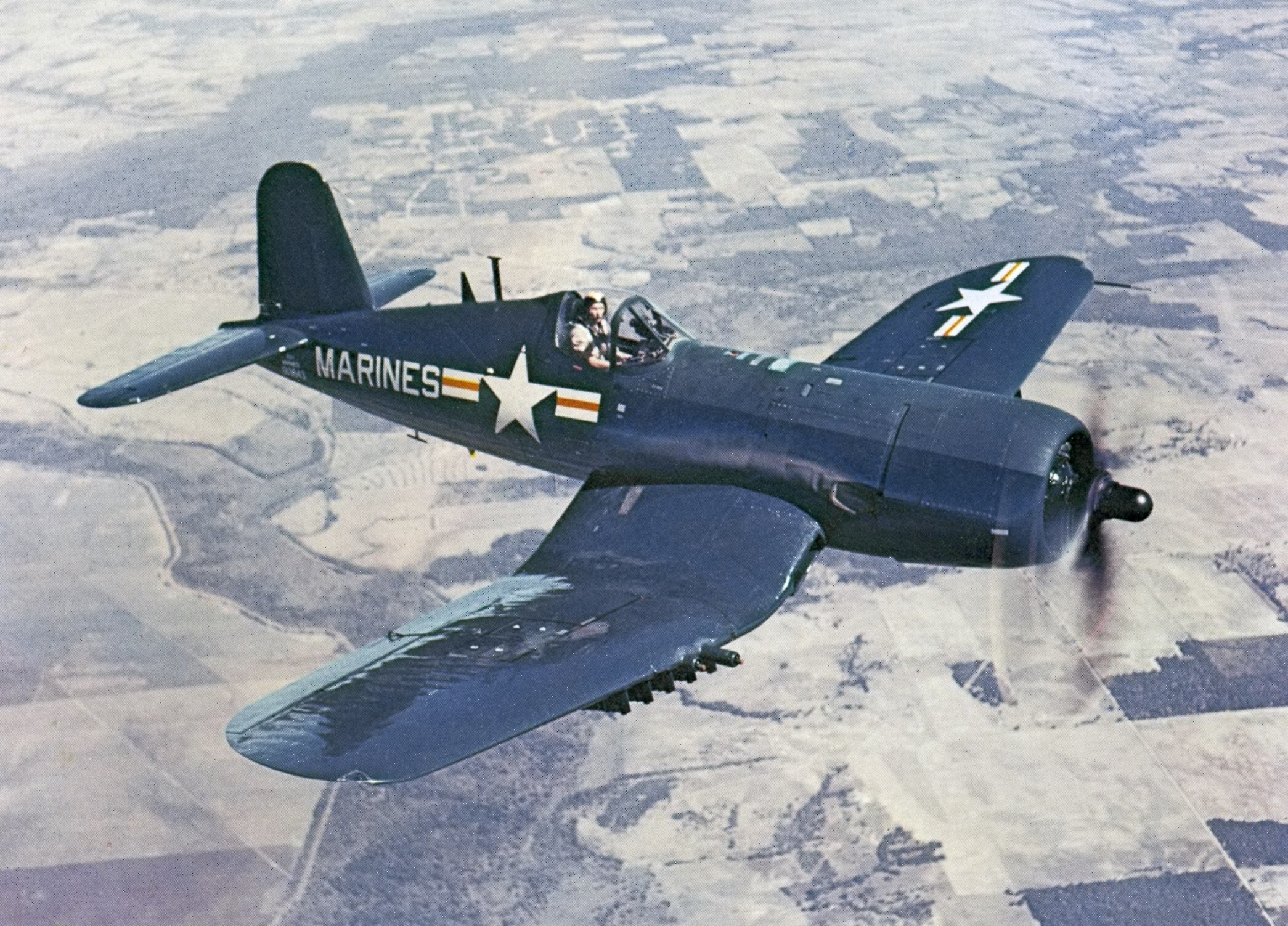
A factory-fresh AU-1, 1952.

F4U-6: Re-designated AU-1, this was a ground-attack version produced for the U.S. Marine Corps.

F4U-7 : AU-1 airframe with -43W engine developed for the French Navy.

FG-1E: Goodyear FG-1 with radar equipment.

FG-1K: Goodyear FG-1 as drone.

FG-3: Turbosupercharger version converted from FG-1D.

FG-4: Goodyear F4U-4, never delivered.

AU-1: U.S. Marines attack variant with extra armor to protect the pilot and fuel tank, and the oil coolers relocated inboard to reduce vulnerability to ground fire. The supercharger was simplified as the design was intended for low-altitude operation. Extra racks were also fitted. Fully loaded for combat, the AU-1 weighed 20% more than a fully loaded F4U-4 and was capable of carrying 8,200 lb (3,700 kg) of bombs. The AU-1 had a maximum speed of 238 miles per hour (383 km/h) at 9,500 ft (2,900 m), when loaded with 4,600 lb (2,100 kg) of bombs and a 150-US-gallon (570 L) drop-tank. When loaded with ten HVAR rockets and two 150-gallon drop-tanks, maximum speed was 298 mph (480 km/h) at 19,700 ft (6,000 m). When not carrying external loads, maximum speed was 389 mph (626 km/h) at 14,000 ft (4,300 m). First produced in 1952 and used in Korea, it was retired in 1957. Re-designated from F4U-6.

=== Super Corsair variants ===
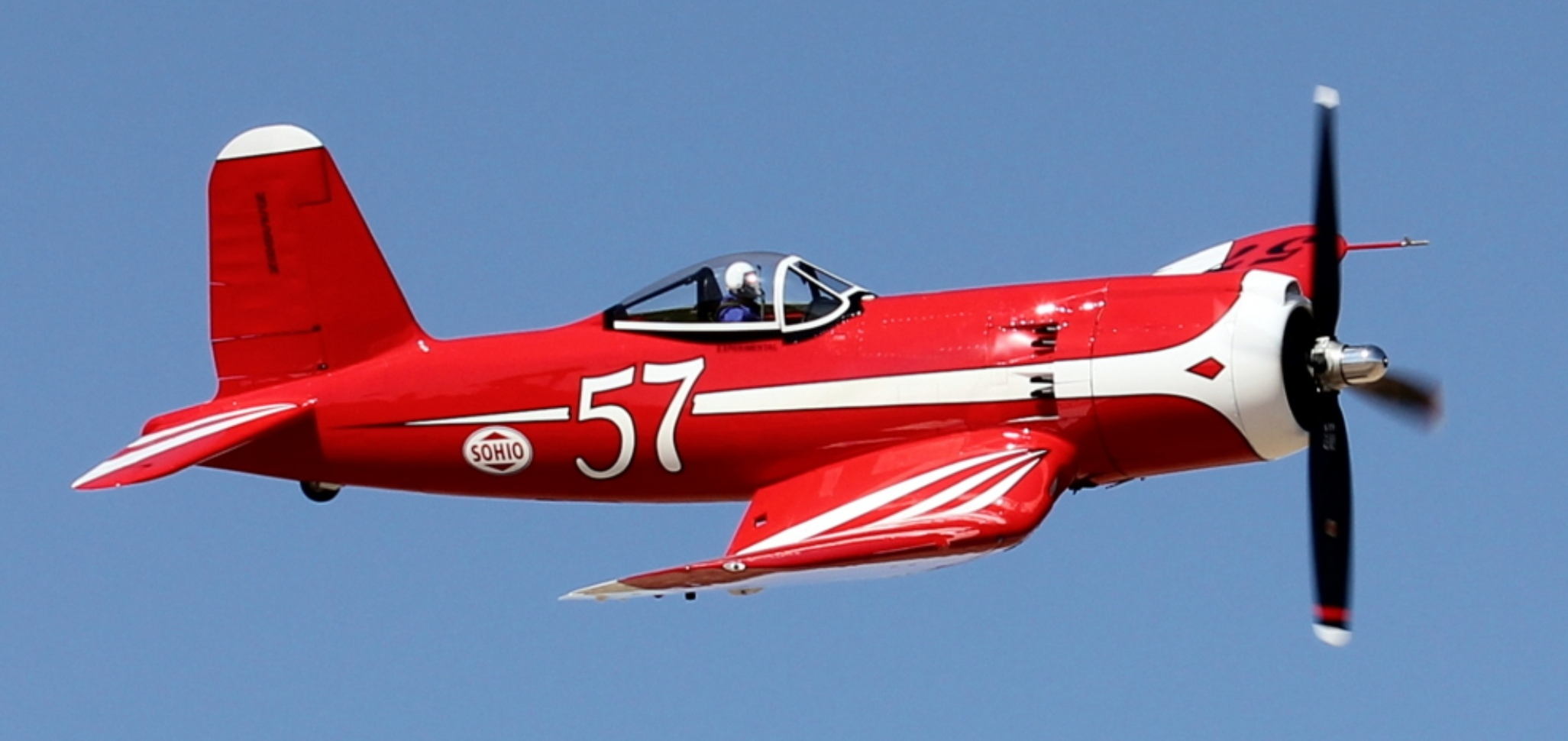
Goodyear F2G-1 Corsair

In March 1944, Pratt & Whitney requested an F4U-1 Corsair from Vought Aircraft for evaluation of their new P&W R-4360, Wasp Major 4-row 28-cylinder "corncob" radial engine. The F2G-1 and F2G-2 were significantly different aircraft. F2G-1 featured a manual folding wing and 14 ft (4.3 m) propeller, while the F2G-2 had hydraulic operated folding wings, 13 ft (4.0 m) propeller, and carrier arresting hook for carrier use. There were five pre-production XF2G-1s: BuNo 14691, 14692, 14693 (Race 94), 14694 (Race 18), and 14695. There were ten production F2Gs: Five F2G-1s BuNo 88454 (Museum of Flight in Seattle, Washington), 88455, 88456, 88457 (Race 84), and 88458 (Race 57), and five F2G-2s BuNo 88459, 88460, 88461, 88462, and 88463 (Race 74). Five F2Gs were sold as surplus and went on to racing success after the war (as indicated by the "Race" number after the BuNo), winning the Thompson Trophy races in 1947 and 1949. The only surviving F2G-1s are BuNos 88454 and 88458 (Race 57). The only surviving F2G-2 was BuNo 88463 (Race 74). It was destroyed in a crash in September 2012 after having a full restoration completed in July 2011.

== Operators ==
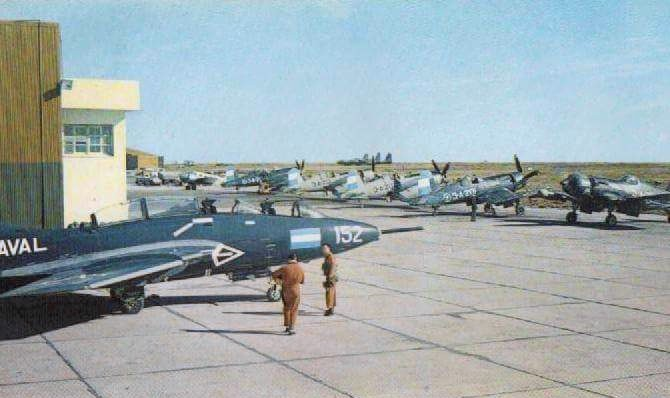
Argentine F9F Cougar and F4U Corsairs, 1960s

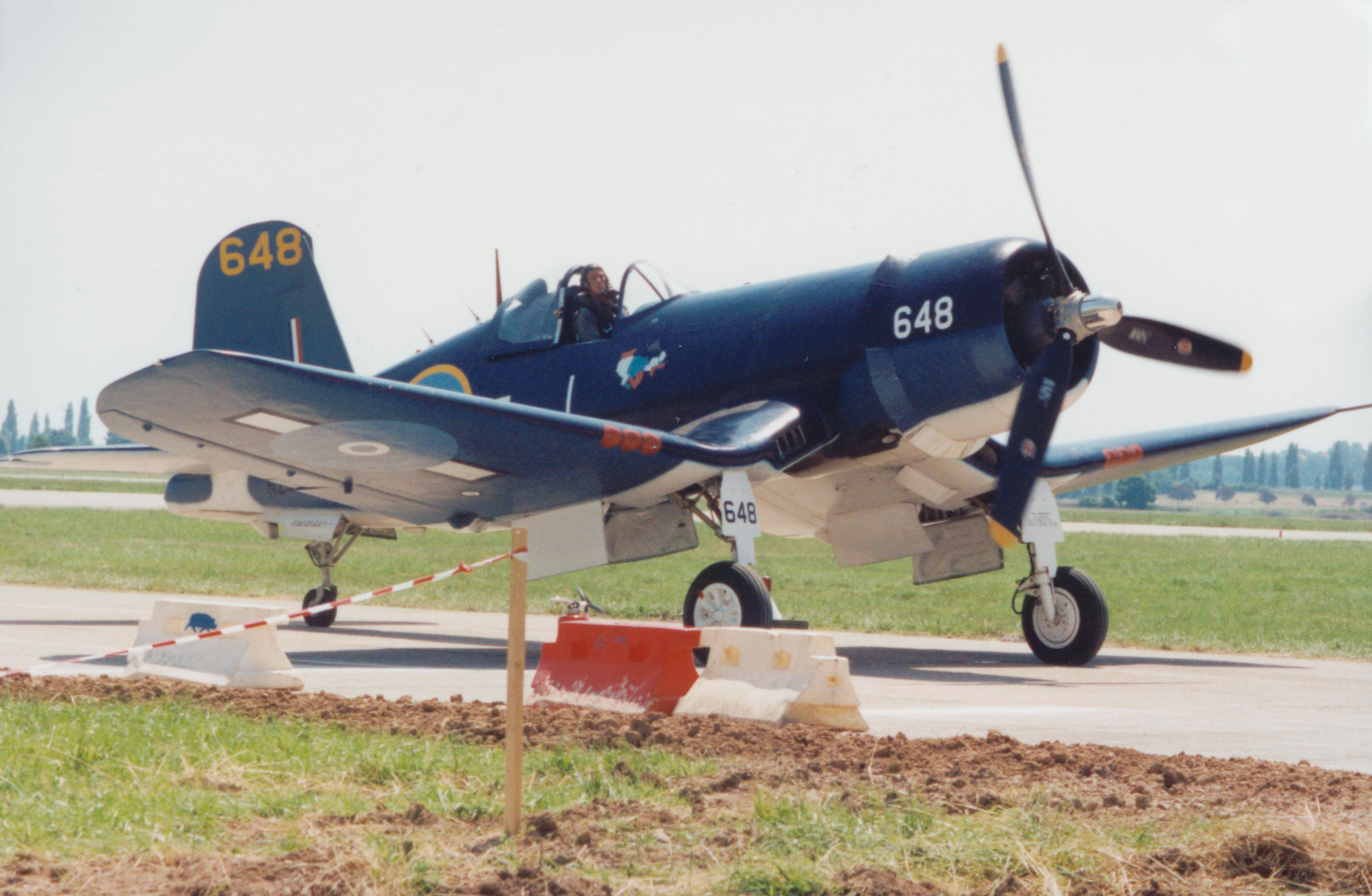
Corsair FG-1D (Goodyear built F4U-1D) in the Royal New Zealand Air Force markings

Argentina

- Argentine Navy Naval Aviation operated 26 F4U-5/5N/5NL Corsairs from 1956 to 1968 from ARA Independencia
  - 2nd Attack Squadron

El Salvador

- Salvadoran Air Force operated 5 F4Us and 20 FG-1Ds from 1957 to 1976
  - Fighting and Bombing Squadron

France

- French Navy Aéronavale operated 69 AU-1 and 94 F4U-7 from 1954 to 1964
  - Flottille 12F
  - Flottille 14F
  - Flottille 15F
  - Flottille 17F
  - Escadrille 10S
  - Escadrille 57S

Honduras

- Honduran Air Force operated 9 F4U-4s and 10 F4U-5N/-5NL/-5Ps from 1956 to 1979

New Zealand

- Royal New Zealand Air Force operated 368 F4U-1s and 60 FG-1Ds from 1944 to 1949
- No. 14 Squadron RNZAF
- No. 15 Squadron RNZAF
- No. 16 Squadron RNZAF
- No. 17 Squadron RNZAF
- No. 18 Squadron RNZAF
- No. 19 Squadron RNZAF
- No. 20 Squadron RNZAF
- No. 21 Squadron RNZAF
- No. 22 Squadron RNZAF
- No. 23 Squadron RNZAF
- No. 24 Squadron RNZAF
- No. 25 Squadron RNZAF
- No. 26 Squadron RNZAF

United Kingdom

- The Royal Navy's Fleet Air Arm operated 2,012 Corsairs of all types during World War II, including 95 Corsair Is (F4U-1), 510 Corsair IIs (F4U-1A), 430 Corsair IIIs (F3A-1D), and 977 Corsair IVs (FG-1D)
- 700 Naval Air Squadron
- 703 Naval Air Squadron
- 706 Naval Air Squadron
- 715 Naval Air Squadron
- 716 Naval Air Squadron
- 718 Naval Air Squadron
- 719 Naval Air Squadron
- 721 Naval Air Squadron
- 723 Naval Air Squadron
- 731 Naval Air Squadron
- 732 Naval Air Squadron
- 736 Naval Air Squadron
- 738 Naval Air Squadron
- 748 Naval Air Squadron
- 757 Naval Air Squadron
- 759 Naval Air Squadron
- 760 Naval Air Squadron
- 767 Naval Air Squadron
- 768 Naval Air Squadron
- 771 Naval Air Squadron
- 778 Naval Air Squadron
- 787 Naval Air Squadron
- 791 Naval Air Squadron
- 794 Naval Air Squadron
- 797 Naval Air Squadron
- 885 Naval Air Squadron
- 1830 Naval Air Squadron
- 1831 Naval Air Squadron
- 1833 Naval Air Squadron
- 1834 Naval Air Squadron
- 1835 Naval Air Squadron
- 1836 Naval Air Squadron
- 1837 Naval Air Squadron
- 1838 Naval Air Squadron
- 1841 Naval Air Squadron
- 1842 Naval Air Squadron
- 1843 Naval Air Squadron
- 1845 Naval Air Squadron
- 1846 Naval Air Squadron
- 1848 Naval Air Squadron
- 1849 Naval Air Squadron
- 1850 Naval Air Squadron
- 1851 Naval Air Squadron
- 1852 Naval Air Squadron

United States

- United States Navy
- United States Marine Corps

== Surviving aircraft ==
According to the FAA there are 45 privately owned F4Us in the U.S.

== Specifications (F4U-4) ==
3-view line drawing of the Vought F4U-1 Corsair

Data from F4U-4 Detail Specification; F4U-4 Airplane Characteristics and Performance

General characteristics

- Crew: One
- Length: 33 ft 8 in (10.26 m)
- Wingspan: 41 ft 0 in (12.50 m)
- Height: 14 ft 9 in (4.50 m)
- Wing area: 314 sq ft (29.17 m^{2})
- Empty weight: 9,205 lb (4,238 kg)
- Gross weight: 14,670 lb (6,654 kg)
- Max takeoff weight: 14,533 lb (6,592 kg)
- Powerplant: 1 × Pratt & Whitney R-2800-18W radial engine, 2,380 hp (1,770 kW)
- Propellers: 4-bladed

Performance

- Maximum speed: 446 mph (717 km/h, 385 kn)
- Cruise speed: 215 mph (346 km/h, 187 kn)
- Stall speed: 89 mph (143 km/h, 77 kn)
- Range: 1,005 mi (1,617 km, 873 nmi)
- Combat range: 328 mi (528 km, 285 nmi)
- Service ceiling: 41,500 ft (12,600 m)
- Rate of climb: 4,360 ft/min (22.1 m/s)

Armament

- Guns: 6 × 0.50 in (12.7 mm) M2 Browning machine guns 375-400 rounds per gun
- Rockets: 8 × 5 in (12.7 cm) high velocity aircraft rockets and/or
- Bombs: 4,000 lb (1,800 kg)

== Notable appearances in media ==
In Disney's "Planes", a character by the name of Skipper Riley is a Chance Vought F4U-1A or 1D model Corsair. He served in WWII with the fictional VF-17 Jolly Wrenches, based on the real WWII era USN Fighter Squadron, VF-17 Jolly Rogers.

== See also ==
- LTV A-7 Corsair II – American attack aircraft family

Related development

- Goodyear F2G Corsair – American fighter aircraft
- Vought V-326 – American research aircraft
- W.A.R. F4U Corsair – American homebuilt warbird replica

Aircraft of comparable role, configuration, and era

- Focke-Wulf Fw 190 – (Nazi Germany)
- Grumman F6F Hellcat – (United States)
- Grumman F8F Bearcat – (United States)
- Hawker Sea Fury – (United Kingdom)
- Kawanishi N1K – (Empire of Japan)
- Nakajima Ki-84 – (Empire of Japan)
- Republic P-47 Thunderbolt – (United States)

Related lists

- List of aircraft of the United States during World War II
- List of aircraft of World War II
- List of military aircraft of the United States
