= Douglas SBD Dauntless in New Zealand service =

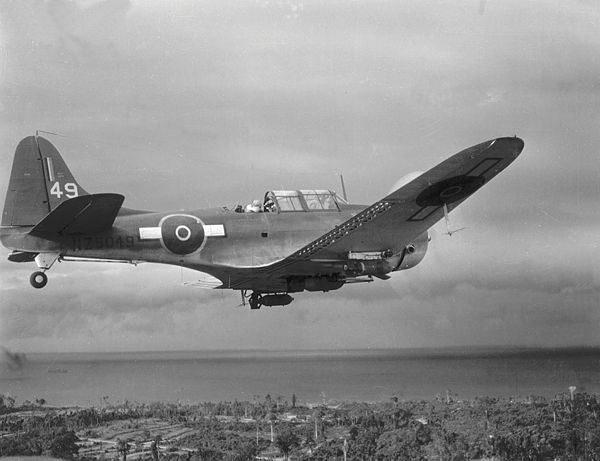
A Dauntless of No. 25 Squadron flying over Bougainville

Developed as a dive bomber, the Douglas SBD Dauntless was widely used by the Allies in the Pacific during the Second World War. The type served with the Royal New Zealand Air Force from 1943 to 1944, equipping No. 25 Squadron in its operations during the Solomon Islands campaign.

== Background ==
The Douglas SBD Dauntless two-seater dive bomber was used by the United States Navy both in carrier and land-based roles. A variant, designated the A-24 Banshee, was operated by the United States Army Air Corps. The SBD-5 version of the Dauntless had a wingspan of 12.66 metres (41.5 ft) and a fuselage length of 9.79 metres (32.1 ft). Powered by a 1,200 hp air cooled Wright Cyclone radial piston engine, it had range of 1,115 miles (1,794 km) at its normal cruising speed of 185 miles per hour (298 km/h). The Dauntless carried a crew of two: a pilot and an observer/gunner. It was armed with four machine guns, two of which were .5 calibre guns in a fixed, forward firing position that was operated by the pilot, while the other two were .30 calibre guns in the dorsal area of the cockpit for use by the observer/gunner. The aircraft could carry a 1,600 pounds (730 kg) bomb directly under the fuselage with one 325 pounds (147 kg) bomb under each wing.

== Acquisition ==
Following the entry of the Empire of Japan into the Second World War in December 1941, and its rapid advance through the Pacific during the first half of the following year, there were major fears that New Zealand would be invaded. The Royal New Zealand Air Force (RNZAF) had relatively few aircraft and these were mostly obsolete. Unable to source new aircraft as the British and Americans prioritised their own needs for the time being, the RNZAF's initial focus was therefore defensive arrangements. Towards the end of 1942, the invasion risk had receded and the RNZAF developed plans to field up to twenty squadrons, many intended for offensive operations.

The United States had overall responsibility in the South Pacific theatre of operations and initially saw New Zealand's role purely as a defensive one. However, Air Vice Marshal Victor Goddard, the Chief of Air Staff in New Zealand and leading the expansion effort of the RNZAF, convinced the United States that New Zealand could play an offensive role in the theatre, if it was given suitable aircraft. For this, the RNZAF was reliant on the United States to update its obsolete inventory as British aircraft output was heavily stretched with its commitments to Europe and North Africa. Eventually, the United States agreed to supply 540 modern aircraft to the RNZAF under a lend-lease scheme and integrate the squadrons into the United States command structure in the South Pacific.

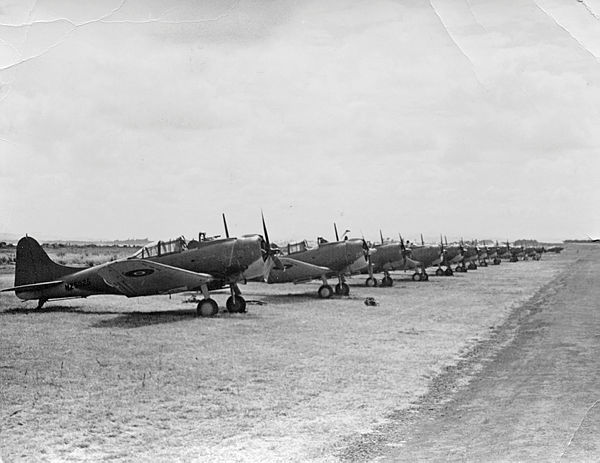
A line up of Dauntless aircraft used by No. 25 Squadron in its early training at Seagrove, Auckland

Under the lend-lease scheme, the RNZAF was set to receive sufficient A-24s to form the basis of four dive bomber squadrons over the period 1943–1944. However, delivery of these A-24s was delayed and in January 1944, it was instead decided to equip the RNZAF with the SBD Dauntless. Another factor in the decision to switch to the SBDs was that by this time, the RNZAF was expected to operate alongside United States Marine Corps (USMC) units operating the type.

== Operational history ==
=== Formation and training ===
No. 25 Squadron was formed in late July 1943 with Squadron Leader Theo de Lange as its commander. The unit was the first of the intended dive bomber squadrons that were to be equipped with the Dauntless. Based at Seagrove, near Auckland, its initial complement of aircraft were nine Dauntless SBD-3s loaned from Marine Aircraft Group 14 of the USMC, also at Seagrove for a period of rest following operations at Guadalcanal. The aircraft were quite worn and often fewer than half were operational at any one time. In September another eight SBD-3s were loaned and two months later, the squadron received an extra nine Dauntlesses, these being the SBD-4 type. During the loan period, these aircraft retained their American markings although by November, once they officially entered New Zealand service, with the serial numbers NZ5001 to NZ5027, most had been repainted in the colours and markings of the RNZAF.

The twelve aircrews that formed the initial complement underwent dive bombing training, supervised by a USMC master sergeant. A proportion of the squadron's ground crew had experience with the type; they had been loaned to the American Field Service based in the South Pacific on Espiritu Santo to assist in the maintenance and repair of American aircraft, and had trained on the Dauntless.

Over the next few months as it continued training, No. 25 Squadron was built up with more personnel. One Dauntless, retrospectively allocated the serial number NZ5007, crashed near Waiuku on 13 September, killing both the pilot and gunner.

=== Training in the Solomon Islands ===
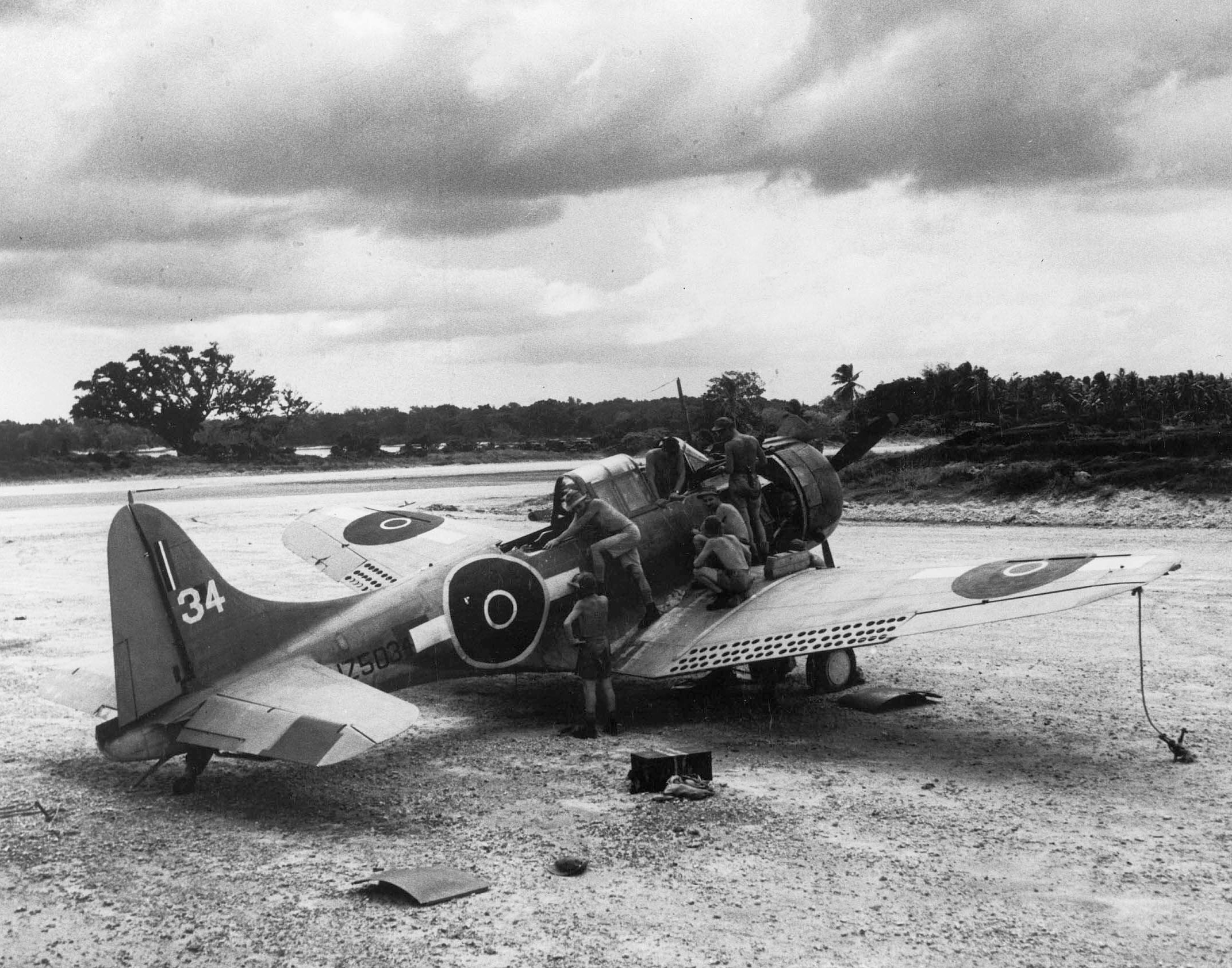
A SBD-4 Dauntless of No. 25 Squadron being serviced on Espiritu Santo

The majority of the ground crew departed New Zealand on 7 December, arriving at Espiritu Santo a week later. The remainder stayed behind to maintain the Dauntlesses at Seagrove, which were intended to be used for training the second dive bomber squadron. However, by the end of the year the plan to raise this second squadron was cancelled and the ground crew still in New Zealand later proceeded to Santo. In the meantime, an allotment of 27 SBD-4 Dauntlesses had been set aside at Santo for the squadron; these were allocated the RNZAF serial numbers NZ5019 to NZ5045. Like the earlier aircraft used in training in New Zealand, these SBD-4s had been extensively used by the USMC and were well worn. The ground crew worked to bring these aircraft into operational status. Once the aircrew and the remainder of the ground crew arrived at Santo, in January 1944, further training in dive bombing, gunnery exercises and navigation commenced.

Training at this time was alongside the USMC's Marine Air Groups 11, 12 and 21, and at times No. 25 Squadron was flying in formations of over 100 aircraft. An aspect of training was instrument flying and on one such sortie, on 11 February, Dauntless NZ5037 and its crew was lost without trace. The following month No. 25 Squadron received brand new 18 SBD-5s; originally from the stores of the USMC, the aircraft carried American insignia but these were shortly replaced with RNZAF roundels. The latest Dauntlesses were allocated RNZAF serials NZ5046 to NZ5063. The SBD-4s the squadron had been training on were returned to the USMC in early March.

=== Combat operations ===
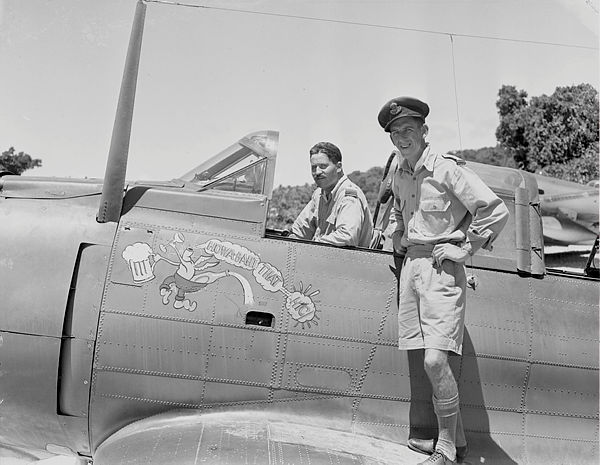
Squadron Leader Theo de Lange, commander of No. 25 Squadron, in the cockpit of his Dauntless with Flying Officer Sewell standing on its wing

By this stage of the war in the South Pacific, the focus of the RNZAF was operations against the Japanese forces present on Rabaul. This was the site of the largest Japanese naval base below the equator. The American ground forces had bypassed the region as it advanced to the Philippines, leaving the garrison on Rabaul to be suppressed from the air. To better facilitate this, a beach head and airfield had been established by the Americans at Torokina on nearby Bougainville Island.

In early March, the ground crew of No. 25 Squadron was moved to Bougainville to set up base at Piva Airfield, one of the airstrips that had been created within the Torokina beachhead. The Japanese forces still present on Bougainville had recently commenced offensive operations against the Allied lines and the airstrip at Piva was only several hundred metres from the front lines. It was subjected to artillery barrages and the personnel on the ground were also expected to form part of the Torokina Airfield Defence Force. Once the situation had settled, the aircrew were able to bring up their aircraft. They flew their Dauntlesses to Henderson Field on Guadalcanal on 22 March, escorted by a Lockheed Ventura of No. 9 Squadron. One SBD-5 was crashed on landing at Henderson, running off the runway and colliding with a vehicle. The next day, nine Dauntlesses flew into Piva with the rest following the next day.

No. 25 Squadron commenced combat operations on 24 March; several bombing sorties were made against Japanese artillery positions on Bougainville and one Dauntless received minor damage from gun fire. The ground crew were able to observe their aircraft in action due to the proximity of the front lines to Piva. Some aircraft also spotted for Allied artillery. The first long range sortie for the squadron was carried out on 26 March when twelve Dauntlesses staged from Nissan Island as part of a large formation attacking on Kavieng Airfield on New Ireland, to the north of Rabaul. Weather conditions meant they were unable to link up with the other aircraft involved and had to turn back.

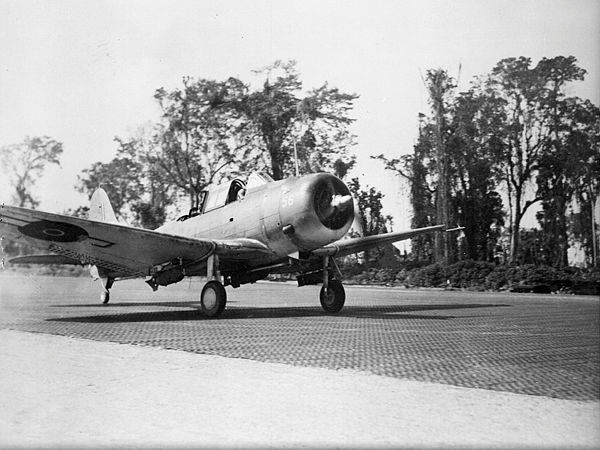
A Dauntless of No. 25 Squadron taxiing at Piva, Bougainville

The next day, 27 March, was the squadron's first attack on Rabaul. Alongside No. 30 Squadron, which had arrived on Bougainville at the same time and used Grumman TBF Avengers torpedo bombers in a dive bomber role, the targeting of the airfields on Rabaul to prevent the resupply of the Japanese forces by air was the squadron's primary role for the bulk of its tour at Piva. The Avengers would bomb the airfields, usually those at Vunakanau and Tobera, while No. 25 Squadron's Dauntlesses would attack the anti-aircraft guns. During its sorties the New Zealand aircraft usually were part of a larger formation, operating alongside aircraft of the USMC and USN. The squadron's attack of 27 March, which targeted munition supplies at Rabaul's Talili Bay, was a success.

Sorties were carried out every day, weather permitting. On return to Piva after the stress of their operations to Rabaul, the aircrew would often have to be fortified with a dose of brandy. By the end of April, there had been signs of progress in the squadron's operations; the anti-aircraft defences around Rabaul had been noticeably reduced. Two Dauntlesses were lost on 2 April when the bombs they carried, which had unable to be released due to a faulty mechanism, exploded as the aircraft landed back at Piva. Three of the four aircrew involved were injured. Another SBD-5 which was to be transferred to the RNZAF was lost on 4 April during its ferry flight from Henderson Field to Piva; the pilot ditched the aircraft and became a prisoner of war, dying in captivity. To make up for these and future losses, five more SBD-5s, allocated serial numbers NZ5064 to NZ5068, would enter service with the squadron in April.

A Dauntless failed to return from a sortie to Lakunai Airfield near Rabaul on 17 April, most likely due to anti-aircraft fire. A second Dauntless received so much damage in this sortie that, while it and its crew returned safely to Piva, the aircraft was written off. The last Dauntless to be lost on a combat operation was NZ5051, which crashed into the sea near Simpson Harbour on 10 May after being hit with anti-aircraft fire during an attack on Lakunai Airfield. Both of its crew were killed. The squadron was withdrawn from operations in late May, after two months of combat sorties. During its tour, 530 sorties were carried out and it dropped 280 tons of bombs. The surviving SBD-5s were returned to the USMC, flown by their crews to Renard Field on the Russell Islands on 20 May. They were in better condition than expected, to the surprise of the USMC officer inspecting the returned aircraft. The RNZAF aircrew were repatriated to New Zealand and No. 25 Squadron was duly disbanded on 19 June. The squadron's place at Piva was replaced with RNZAF squadrons operating the Vought F4U Corsair in a fighter-bomber role.

== Disposal ==
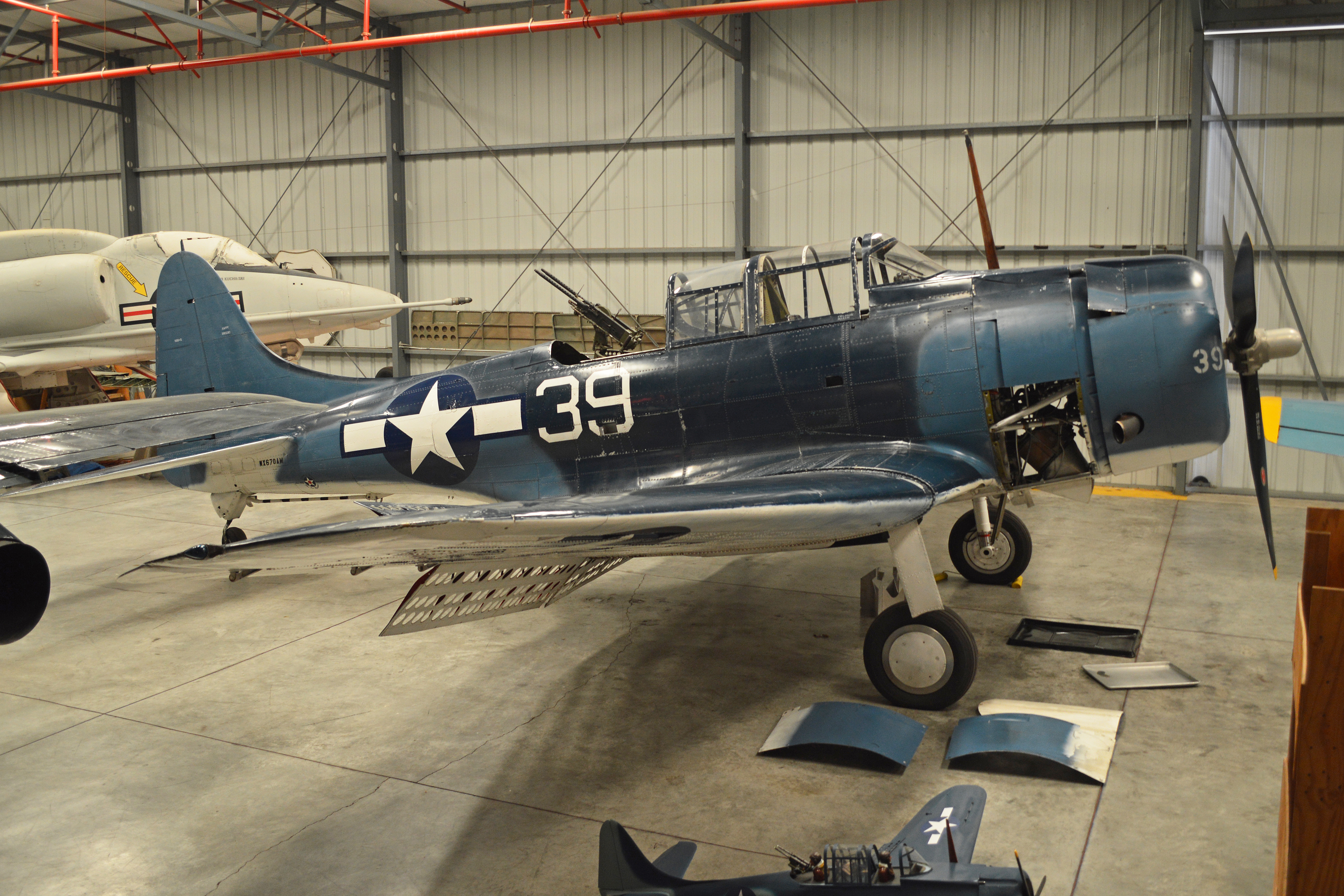
A Dauntless that served with the RNZAF on display at the Planes of Fame Air Museum in 2016

In total, the RNZF operated 68 Douglas Dauntless dive bombers. (Note: One Dauntless was lost before it officially entered service with the RNZAF, so is not included in this number.) In its combat operations, No. 25 Squadron lost five aircraft, two of which were shot down by Japanese anti-aircraft fire. Of the 27 SBD-3s and SBD-4s still in New Zealand, two were destroyed in accidents. This left 25 aircraft which had been placed in storage at RNZAF Station Hobsonville in February 1944, following the RNZAF's shift in focus to fighter operations. Three of these were transferred to the United States Navy in June 1944 while the remaining aircraft were eventually sold for scrap in 1948.

The wreckage of the Dauntless that was lost while No. 25 Squadron was in training on Espiritu Santo was discovered in remote hilly terrain in 1987 and salvaged for return to New Zealand. No trace of the crew was found. Another SBD-5 that had been used by No. 25 Squadron in the Solomon Islands is in the collection of the Planes of Fame Air Museum in the United States.
