= John James Powers =

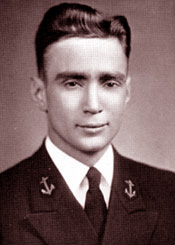
- Powers as a midshipman
- Born: July 3, 1912; New York City, US
- Died: May 8, 1942 (aged 29); Coral Sea
- Burial place: body never recovered
- Military career
- Allegiance: United States of America
- Branch: United States Navy
- Service years: 1935 - 1942
- Rank: Lieutenant
- Conflicts: World War II; *Battle of the Coral Sea †
- Awards: Medal of Honor; Purple Heart; Air Medal (2)

John James Powers (July 3, 1912 – May 8, 1942) was a United States Navy officer and a recipient of the United States military's highest decoration, the Medal of Honor, for his actions in World War II. He was born in New York City on July 3, 1912, and graduated from the U.S. Naval Academy in 1935.

== Early life ==
John James Powers was born on July 3, 1912, in New York City. He was appointed to the United States Naval Academy from New York and graduated an Ensign in 1935.

== Military career ==
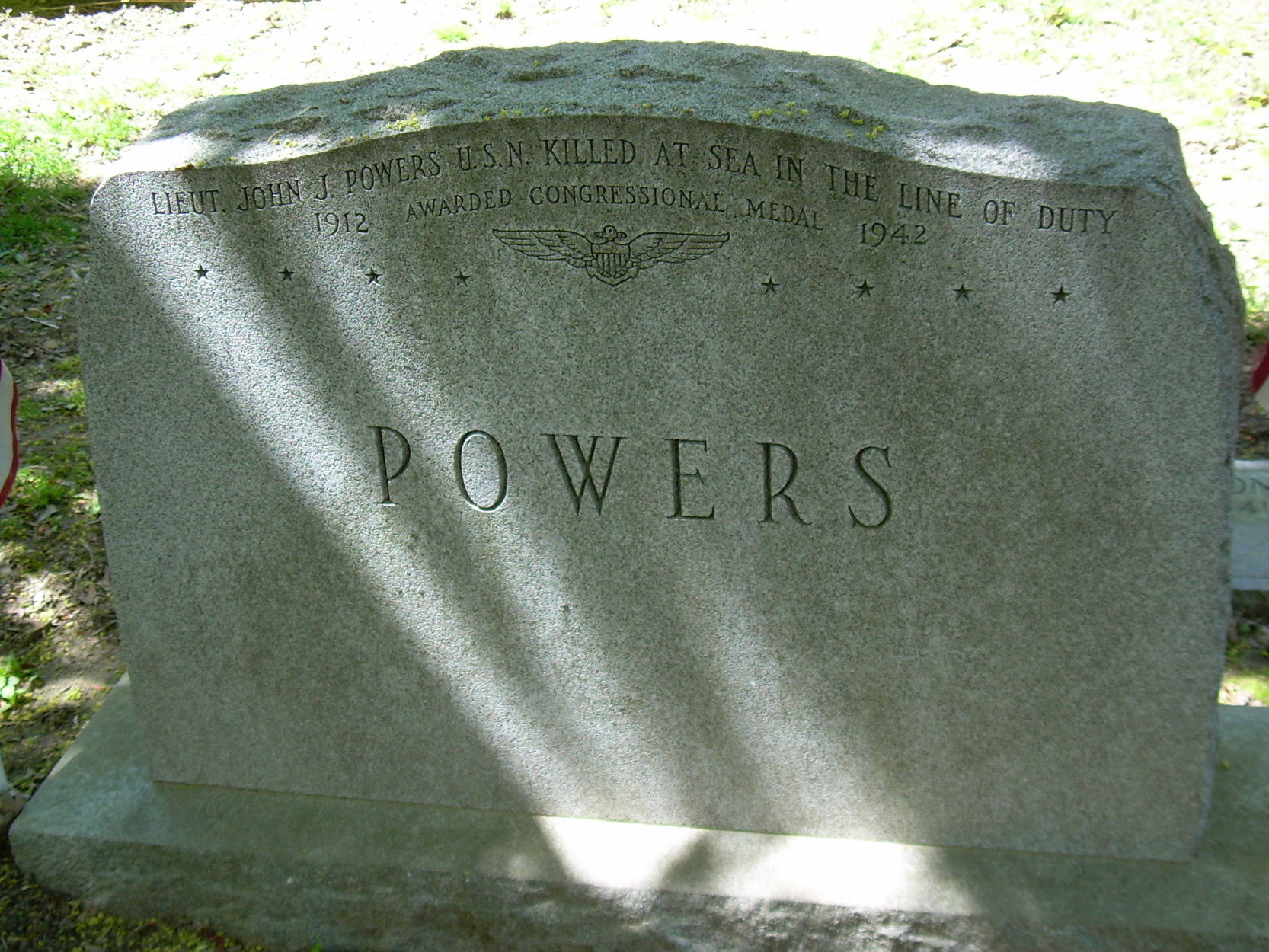
Cenotaph at Woodlawn Cemetery (Bronx, New York)

For sea duty, he reported to USS West Virginia and transferred two years later to USS Augusta. In June 1938, Powers was promoted to Lieutenant Junior Grade. Remaining at sea, he served on board USS Utah. After completion of flight training at Naval Air Station, Pensacola in January 1941, he was designated a Naval Aviator. He was assigned January 21, 1941, to Bombing Squadron 5 (flying the SBD Dauntless), attached to the USS Yorktown. He was assigned as Squadron Gunnery Officer.

=== World War II ===
As the fleet moved to prevent further Japanese expansion in the Solomons, Powers took part in the May 4, 1942, raid on Tulagi, flying without fighter cover to score two hits on Japanese ships. As the main Battle of the Coral Sea developed on May 7, 1942, Powers and his companions discovered carrier Shōhō and, bombing at extremely low altitudes, sank her in 10 minutes. The next morning, May 8, while the carrier battle continued, he joined the attack on the carrier Shokaku, scoring an important bomb hit. Powers’ low-bombing run, brought him into heavy antiaircraft fire, and his plane plunged into the sea. Powers was declared dead and, for his actions in this series of attacks, he was posthumously awarded the Medal of Honor.

=== Medal of Honor citation ===
According to the citation: "... completely disregarding the safety altitude and without fear or concern for his own safety, he courageously pressed home his attack, almost to the very deck of an enemy carrier and did not release his bomb until he was sure of a direct hit."

He sacrificed his life when he deliberately dove his plane from 18,000 feet to an extremely low altitude before release in order to insure a direct hit on the Japanese aircraft carrier, making good his words to his pilots prior to takeoff: "Remember—the folks back home are counting on us. I am going to get a direct hit if I have to lay it on the flight deck." This, according to "20 Year Rendezvous: 1935 Lucky Bag", a 20th graduation anniversary book published by the Naval Academy for members of that class.

Speaking at length about Lt. Powers in a September 1942 radio address, President Franklin Roosevelt remarked, "He led [his squadron] down to the target from an altitude of 18,000 feet, through a wall of bursting anti-aircraft shells and swarms of enemy planes. He dived almost to the very deck of the enemy carrier, and did not release his bomb until he was sure of a direct hit. He was last seen attempting recovery from his dive at the extremely low altitude of two hundred feet, amid a terrific barrage of shell and bomb fragments, smoke, flame and debris from the stricken vessel. His own plane was destroyed by the explosion of his own bomb. But he had made good his promise to 'lay it on the flight deck.'"

=== Legacy ===
In a September 1943 radio address to the nation, Franklin D. Roosevelt said, "During the first two days [of the Battle of the Coral Sea], Lieutenant Powers, flying a divebomber in the face of blasting enemy anti-aircraft fire, demolished one large enemy gunboat, put another gunboat out of commission, severely damaged an aircraft tender and a twenty thousand ton transport, and scored a direct hit on an aircraft carrier which burst into flames and sank soon after."

On May 4, 2017, President Donald Trump gave a speech at the Intrepid Museum to commemorate the 75th Anniversary of the Battle of the Coral Sea and its veterans. He also acknowledged the Australian contribution to the battle. Prime Minister of Australia Malcolm Turnbull was at Trump's side as he made his remark. President Trump discussed how impressed he was by the bravery of Lt. Powers, whose honor, courage, and commitment earned him the Medal of Honor. President Trump honored the sacrifices of Powers and others with these words:

Now it is we who are thinking of Jack, and all those brave souls who fought alongside of him – with that incredible form of attack – and especially those who found their final resting place beneath the waters where they waged that greatest of battles. They lost their lives in the fires of war, but gained immortality through their sacrifice. And now, 75 years later, we hope that we are worthy of their deeds in the beautiful, beautiful Coral Sea. We hope to be worthy of the sacrifices made by every service member who has fought in our name – past and present.

== Medal of Honor citation ==
=== Medal of Honor citation ===
Rank and organization: Lieutenant, U.S. Navy. Born: 13 July 1912, New York City, N.Y. Accredited to: New York. Other Navy award: Air Medal with 1 gold star.

Citation:

For distinguished and conspicuous gallantry and intrepidity at the risk of his life above and beyond the call of duty, while pilot of an airplane of Bombing Squadron 5, Lt. Powers participated, with his squadron, in 5 engagements with Japanese forces in the Coral Sea area and adjacent waters during the period 4 to 8 May 1942. Three attacks were made on enemy objectives at or near Tulagi on 4 May. In these attacks he scored a direct hit which instantly demolished a large enemy gunboat or destroyer and is credited with 2 close misses, 1 of which severely damaged a large aircraft tender, the other damaging a 20,000-ton transport. He fearlessly strafed a gunboat, firing all his ammunition into it amid intense antiaircraft fire. This gunboat was then observed to be leaving a heavy oil slick in its wake and later was seen beached on a nearby island. On 7 May, an attack was launched against an enemy airplane carrier and other units of the enemy's invasion force. He fearlessly led his attack section of 3 Douglas Dauntless dive bombers, to attack the carrier. On this occasion he dived in the face of heavy antiaircraft fire, to an altitude well below the safety altitude, at the risk of his life and almost certain damage to his own plane, in order that he might positively obtain a hit in a vital part of the ship, which would insure her complete destruction. This bomb hit was noted by many pilots and observers to cause a tremendous explosion engulfing the ship in a mass of flame, smoke, and debris. The ship sank soon after. That evening, in his capacity as Squadron Gunnery Officer, Lt. Powers gave a lecture to the squadron on point-of-aim and diving technique. During this discourse he advocated low release point in order to insure greater accuracy; yet he stressed the danger not only from enemy fire and the resultant low pull-out, but from own bomb blast and bomb fragments. Thus his low-dive bombing attacks were deliberate and premeditated, since he well knew and realized the dangers of such tactics, but went far beyond the call of duty in order to further the cause which he knew to be right. The next morning, 8 May, as the pilots of the attack group left the ready room to man planes, his indomitable spirit and leadership were well expressed in his own words, "Remember the folks back home are counting on us. I am going to get a hit if I have to lay it on their flight deck." He led his section of dive bombers down to the target from an altitude of 18,000 feet, through a wall of bursting antiaircraft shells and into the face of enemy fighter planes. Again, completely disregarding the safety altitude and without fear or concern for his safety, Lt. Powers courageously pressed home his attack, almost to the very deck of an enemy carrier and did not release his bomb until he was sure of a direct hit. He was last seen attempting recovery from his dive at the extremely low altitude of 200 feet, and amid a terrific barrage of shell and bomb fragments, smoke, flame and debris from the stricken vessel.

== Awards and decorations ==

| | Naval Aviator Badge | | |
| 1st row | Medal of Honor | | Purple Heart |
| 2nd row | Air Medal with 5/16 inch star | Presidential Unit Citation | American Defense Service Medal with Fleet clasp |
| 3rd row | American Campaign Medal | Asiatic-Pacific Campaign Medal with 1 Campaign star | World War II Victory Medal |

== Namesake ==
His mother christened the USS John J. Powers (DE-528), which was named after him, in February 1944. There is a plaque bearing his name in Memorial Hall at the U.S. Naval Academy.

There is a cenotaph monument to him at Woodlawn Cemetery in The Bronx, New York.

== See also ==
- List of Medal of Honor recipients
- List of Medal of Honor recipients for World War II
