= USS John J. Powers =

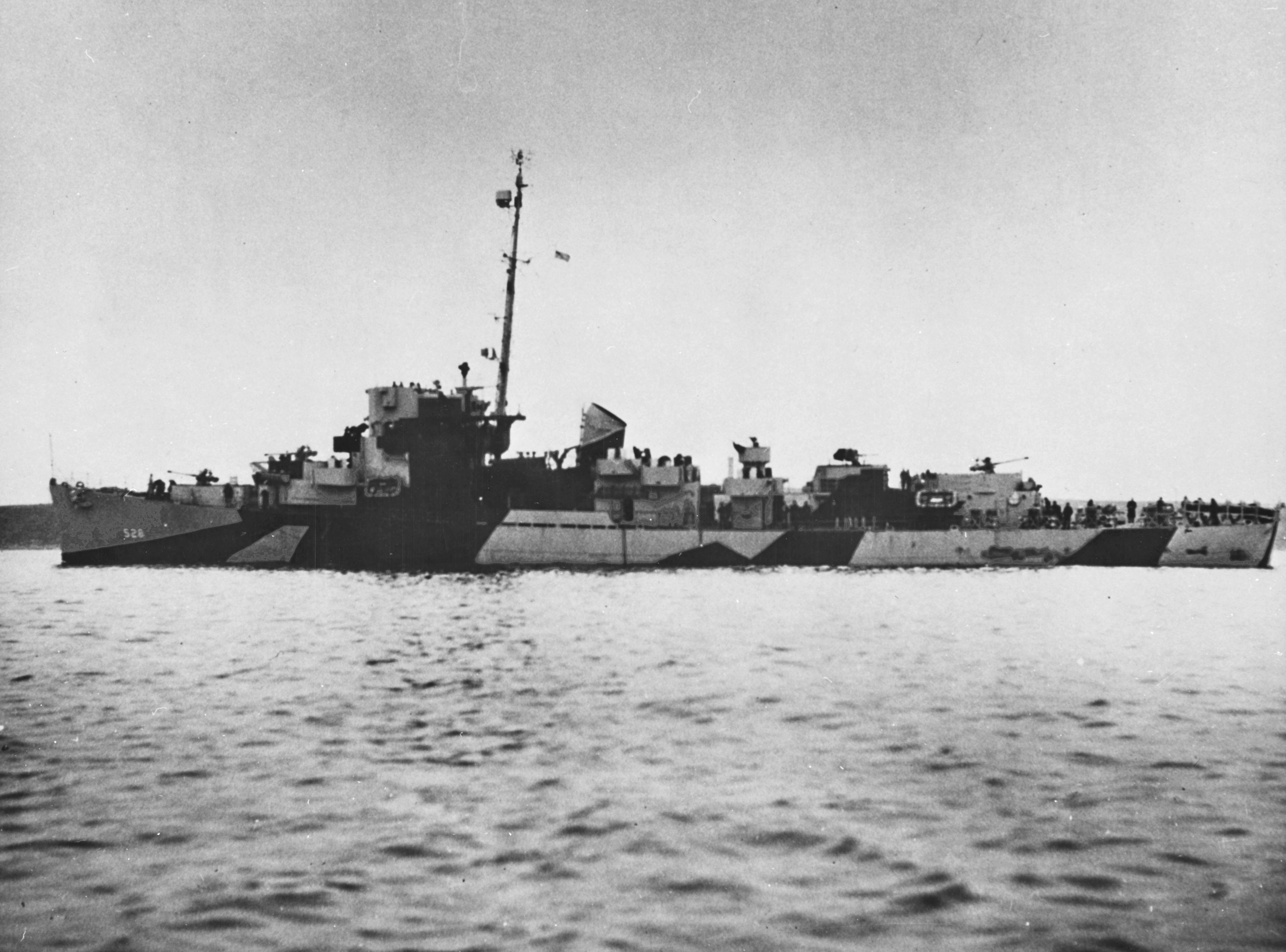
- John J. Powers underway c. 1944

History

United States
- Name: USS John J. Powers
- Namesake: John James Powers
- Laid down: 25 September 1943
- Launched: 2 November 1943
- Commissioned: 29 February 1944
- Decommissioned: 16 October 1945
- Stricken: 1 November 1945
- Fate: Scrapped at Charleston Navy Yard, 1946

General characteristics
- Type: Evarts-class destroyer escort
- Displacement: 1,140 long tons (1,158 t) standard; 1,430 long tons (1,453 t) full
- Length: 289 ft 5 in (88.21 m) o/a; 283 ft 6 in (86.41 m) w/l
- Beam: 35 ft 2 in (10.72 m)
- Draft: 11 ft (3.4 m) (max)
- Propulsion: 4 × General Motors Model 16-278A diesel engines with electric drive, 6,000 shp (4,474 kW); 2 screws
- Speed: 19 knots (35 km/h; 22 mph)
- Range: 4,150 nmi (7,690 km)
- Complement: 15 officers and 183 enlisted
- Armament: 3 × single 3"/50 Mk.22 dual purpose guns; 1 × quad 1.1"/75 Mk.2 AA gun; 9 × 20 mm Mk.4 AA guns; 1 × Hedgehog Projector Mk.10 (144 rounds); 8 × Mk.6 depth charge projectors; 2 × Mk.9 depth charge tracks

USS John J. Powers (DE-528) was an Evarts-class destroyer escort of the United States Navy during World War II. She was sent off into dangerous North Atlantic Ocean waters to protect convoys and other ships from German submarines and fighter aircraft. She performed escort and anti-submarine operations in battle areas before sailing home victorious at the end of the conflict.

== Design ==
The Evarts-class destroyer escorts were 289 ft 5 in (88.21 m) long overall, and they had a beam of 35 ft 2 in (10.72 m). They had an average draft of 10 ft 1 in (3.07 m) at their full load displacement of 1,416 long tons (1,439 t). Each ship had a normal crew numbered 156 officers and sailors.

John J. Powers was propelled by a pair of diesel motors manufactured by General Motors, which drove a pair of screw propellers. Her propulsion system was rated to produce 6,000 brake horsepower (4,500 kW) for a top speed of 19.5 knots (36.1 km/h; 22.4 mph). Oil storage amounted to between 131 and 197 long tons (133 and 200 t), which allowed a cruising radius of up to 6,000 nautical miles (11,000 km; 6,900 mi) at an economical pace of 10 knots (19 km/h; 12 mph).

The ship's armament consisted of a main battery of three 3-inch (76 mm) /50-caliber guns in individual pivot mounts, which could be used against air or surface targets. These were supported by a light anti-aircraft battery that initially consisted of four 1.1 in (28 mm) /75-caliber guns in a quadruple mount and nine 20 mm (0.79 in) Oerlikon guns. For attacks against submarines, the ship was equipped with a Hedgehog mortar, eight depth charge throwers, and two depth charge racks.

== Service history ==
She was named in honor of John James Powers, a U.S. Navy Medal of Honor recipient who died during the Battle of the Coral Sea. John J. Powers was laid down 25 September 1943 by Boston Navy Yard; launched on 2 November 1943; sponsored by Mrs. John J. Powers, mother of Lt. Powers; and commissioned on 29 February 1944.

After shakedown training off Bermuda, John J. Powers returned to Boston, Massachusetts, on 19 April for anti-submarine exercises. She then steamed to New York to join a convoy for northern Europe, departing on 2 May. The ship returned with another convoy on 28 May 1944. With American troops and equipment building up in England for the cross-channel invasion, John J. Powers made a second convoy voyage, arriving Boston on 2 August 1944. She then engaged in training followed by a coastal run from New York to Halifax and back.

The escort vessel got underway for Atlantic convoy duty again on 19 September 1944, escorting a convoy of tankers and barges to England. Seven days later the alert ship rescued four crewmen from capsized Army tug ST-719. John J. Powers returned to New York on 20 November and in December conducted special depth charge tests for the Bureau of Ordnance off New York and in Chesapeake Bay. In the months that followed, the ship made three more escort voyages to Casablanca, departing Mers El Kébir on 7 May 1945, the day of the German surrender.

John J. Powers returned to New York on 23 May 1945 and, after maneuvers in Casco Bay, Maine, arrived Miami, Florida, on 21 July for duty as a training ship. During August she provided tactical training for student officers in the Straits of Florida. The war over, John J. Powers sailed on 8 September 1945 for Charleston, South Carolina, where she decommissioned on 16 October 1945. The ship was scrapped by Charleston Navy Yard in February 1946.
