= No. 25 Squadron RNZAF =

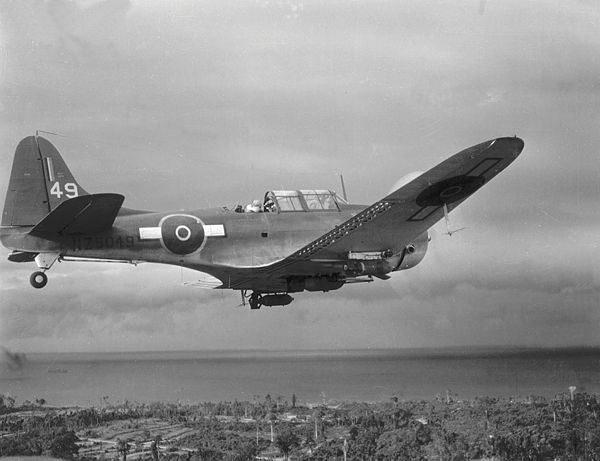
- A Dauntless of No. 25 Squadron flying over Bougainville
- Active: July 1943 – September 1945
- Country: New Zealand
- Branch: Royal New Zealand Air Force
- Role: Dive bomber (1943–1944); Fighter (1944–1945)
- Motto: Tohe Tonu (Constant Endeavour)
- Colors: black and white
- Anniversaries: 31 July 1943
- Equipment: SBD Dauntless; F4U Corsair
- Engagements: World War II: Solomon Islands campaign

Insignia
- Squadron Badge: A caspian tern diving into the sea in search of prey

No. 25 Squadron of the Royal New Zealand Air Force was formed at Seagrove, Auckland in July 1943 with Douglas SBD Dauntless dive bombers and served in the Southern Pacific based at the Piva Airstrip on Bougainville, flying missions against Japanese forces on Bougainville and at Rabaul. It was disbanded in May 1944 and reformed as a fighter/ground attack squadron flying F4U Corsairs. It served in Santo, Guadalcanal, Los Negros and Emirau, before returning to New Zealand and being disbanded in September 1945.

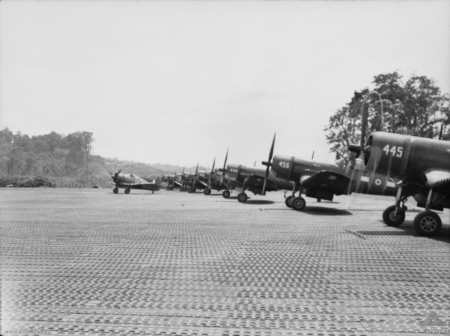
RNZAF Corsairs with an RAAF Boomerang on Bougainville, 1945.

== Formation ==
No. 25 Squadron was formed at Seagrove Aerodrome, near Auckland, in July 1943 under the command of Squadron Leader Theo de Lange. Its initial complement of aircraft was nine Douglas Dauntless SBD-3 dive bombers loaned from United States Marine Aircraft Group 14, which had been stationed at Seagrove. More Dauntlesses were received in following months as the flying personnel trained in dive bombing techniques in preparation for service in the Solomon Islands campaign. On 13 September, Pilot Officer William McJannet and Sergeant Douglas Cairns were killed when their Dauntless crashed near Waiuku.

== Espiritu Santo ==
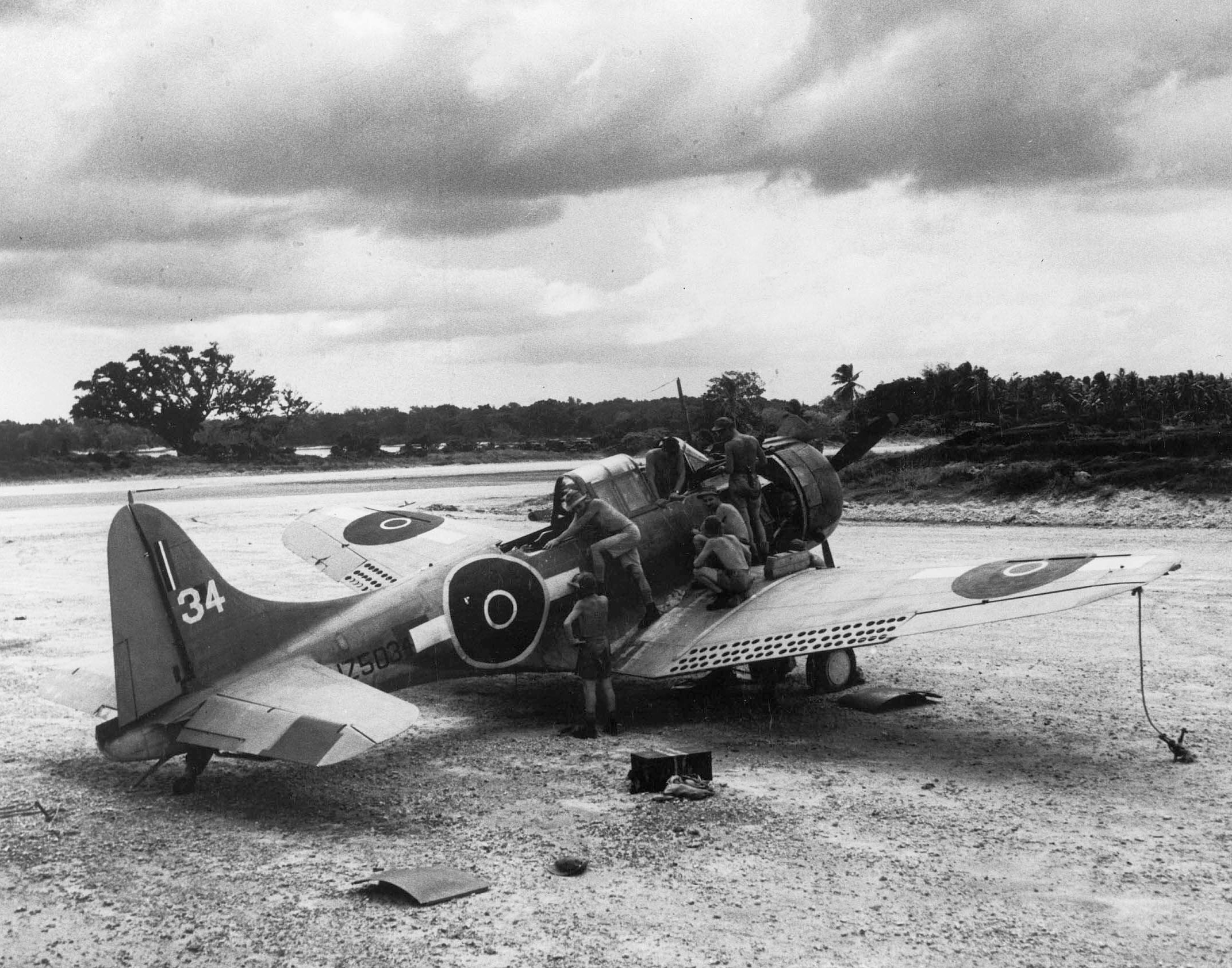
SBD-4 NZ5034 at Espiritu Santo.

On 30 January 1944 squadron personnel were flown by Lodestar and C-47 aircraft of No. 40 Squadron to Espiritu Santo for further training with American units. Eighteen SBD-4 Dauntlesses aircraft were awaiting them so the aircrew could complete training in gunnery, dive-bombing and formation flying. During this period, one Dauntless was lost on an exercise and no trace of it or its crew were found. This aircraft was eventually discovered in 1987 and the wreckage returned to New Zealand. No remains of the crew, Flying Officer Alexander Moore and Flight Sergeant John Munro, were found.

The squadron received eighteen new SBD-5 aircraft in February 1944. The intention was to deploy the squadron immediately at Piva Airfield on the island of Bougainville, but due to the tenuous state of the Allied beachhead on the island, deployment was delayed until the risk of shelling on the Piva Airfield had reduced.

== Combat operations ==
No. 25 Squadron flew in its SBD-5s to Guadalcanal on 22 March, escorted by four Venturas and one C-47 from 40 Squadron. A Catalina from 6 Squadron stood by at Halavo Seaplane Base in the Florida Islands as a safety aircraft. From Henderson Field the squadron flew to Piva Airfield on 23 January. Upon landing at Piva, the New Zealanders found themselves on a narrow beachhead, with Japanese forces shelling and attacking the perimeter.

The first mission flown from Piva was an artillery-spotting exercise undertaken by MacLean de Lange and his gunner on 24 March. Over the course of the day, the squadron flew three more sorties against the Japanese. So close were the enemy, that during one of these raids, ground crew on the airstrip were able to watch the pilots drop their bombs. Throughout the squadron's combat tour, it would be called upon to attack Japanese supply depots and other targets on Bougainville and assist the American ground forces in their campaign on the island. However, its main focus was to assist in the suppression of the Japanese garrison on Rabaul, working with No. 30 Squadron in attacking the Japanese airfields there to prevent resupply by air.

The squadron's tour ended on 20 May. The surviving SBDs took off from Piva and landed at Renard Field in the Russell Islands where the aircraft were returned to American ownership. The squadron personnel were flown to RNZAF Base Whenuapai the following day.

=== Tour summary ===
No. 25 Squadron flew missions from Piva for approximately eight weeks, flying a total of 32 missions and dropping 498,800 pounds (226,300 kg) of bombs.

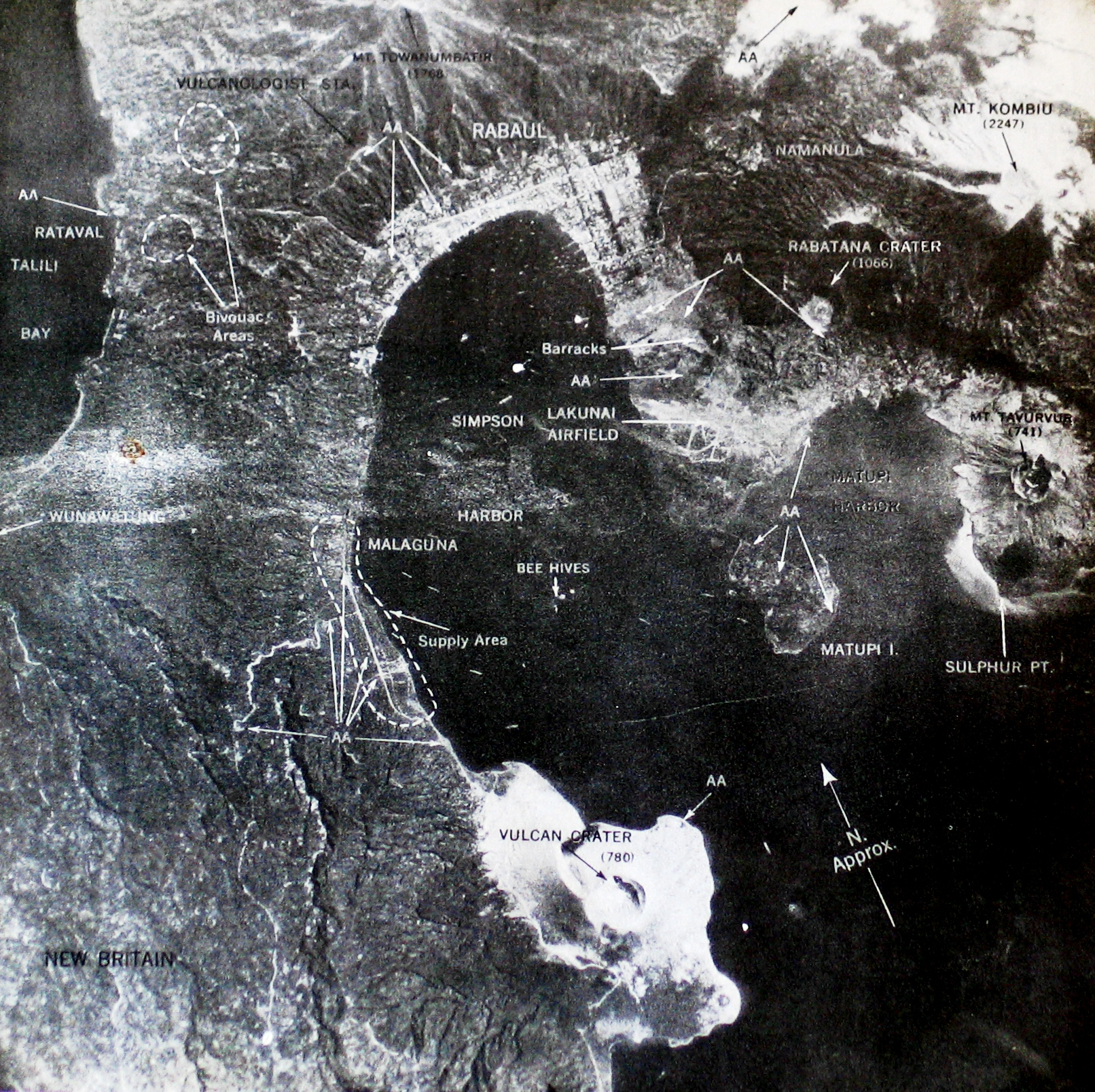
Aerial view of Rabaul area showing location of Lakunai airstrip and known AAA sites

Dozens of artillery pieces were destroyed and considerable damage caused to airfields and other military property. During its operations, five aircraft were lost; two of these were shot down by Japanese anti-aircraft fire, killing their crews. A fifth man, Flying Officer Leslie McLellan-Symonds, was lost on a ferry flight and became a prisoner of war. He died in captivity.

== Reformation ==
No. 25 Squadron was reformed in October 1944 with a new commanding officer, Squadron Leader G. M. Fitzwater. It was a fighter-bomber squadron equipped with F4U Corsairs (F4U-1s and F4U-1Ds). Several of the original pilots of the squadron were transferred to the new squadron. It went to Espiritu Santo at the end of the year, and then moved to Guadalcanal. The squadron operated from Los Negros from January to February 1945, was rested, and then returned to operations, based at Emirau from May to July. Graham Howie who was killed on take-off when his engine failed and he crashed into the jungle on 13 June 1945. No. 25 Squadron was disbanded in September 1945.

== Commanding officers ==
The following served as commanding officers of No. 25 Squadron:

- Squadron Leader T. J. MacLean de Lange (July 1943-June 1944)
- Squadron Leader G. M. Fitzwater (October 1944–September 1945)

== See also ==
- Douglas SBD Dauntless in New Zealand service
