= Douglas SBD Dauntless =

Scout and dive bomber aircraft

SBD Dauntless A-24 Banshee
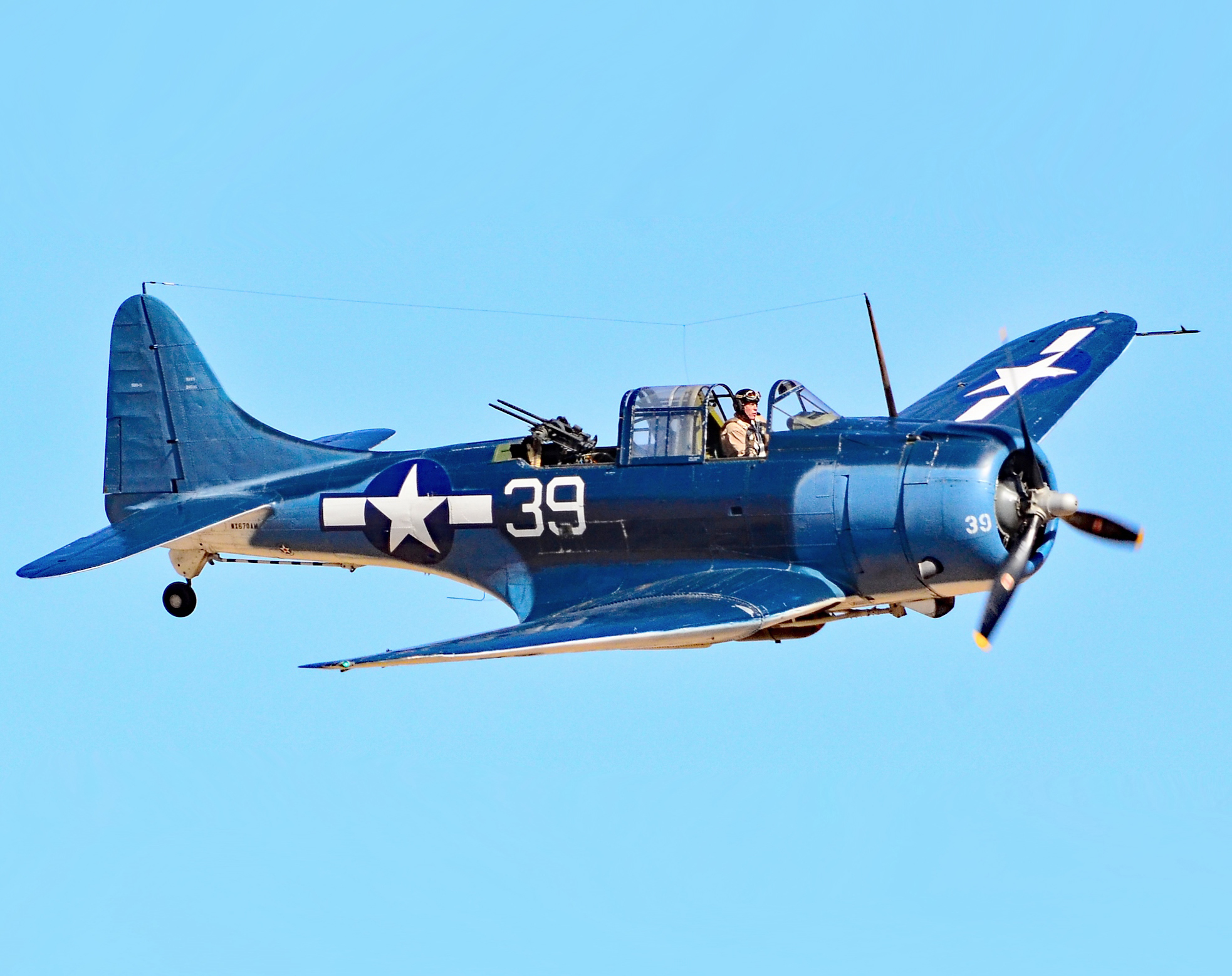
- A restored SBD-5 Dauntless from the Planes of Fame Air Museum

General information
- Type: Dive bomber Scout plane
- National origin: United States
- Manufacturer: Douglas Aircraft
- Designer: Ed Heinemann
- Primary users: United States Navy United States Marine Corps; United States Army Air Forces; Free French Air Forces
- Number built: 5,936

History
- Manufactured: 1940–1944
- Introduction date: 1940
- First flight: 1 May 1940
- Retired: 1959 (Mexico)
- Developed from: Northrop BT

The Douglas SBD Dauntless is a World War II American naval scout plane and dive bomber that was manufactured by Douglas Aircraft from 1940 through 1944. The SBD ("Scout Bomber Douglas") was the United States Navy's main carrier-based scout/dive bomber from mid-1940 through mid-1944. The SBD was also flown by the United States Marine Corps, both from land air bases and aircraft carriers. The SBD is best remembered as the bomber that delivered the fatal blows to the Japanese carriers at the Battle of Midway in June 1942. The type earned its nickname "Slow But Deadly" (from its SBD initials) during this period. Even though the SBD was ostensibly replaced by the Curtiss SB2C Helldiver in 1944, experience showed the earlier plane performed better, and both models fought side-by-side until the end of the war.

During its combat service, the SBD proved to be an effective naval scout plane and dive bomber. It possessed long range, good handling characteristics, maneuverability, potent bomb load, and great diving characteristics from the perforated dive brakes. A land-based variant of the SBD – omitting the arrestor hook — was purpose-built for the U.S. Army Air Forces, as the A-24 Banshee. Due to lack of specialized training, though, the Army's experience was not as successful, and by the middle of 1943, the A-24 was considered by pilots to be too vulnerable for service, owing to its armament and slow speed, and was relegated to noncombat roles.

== Design and development ==
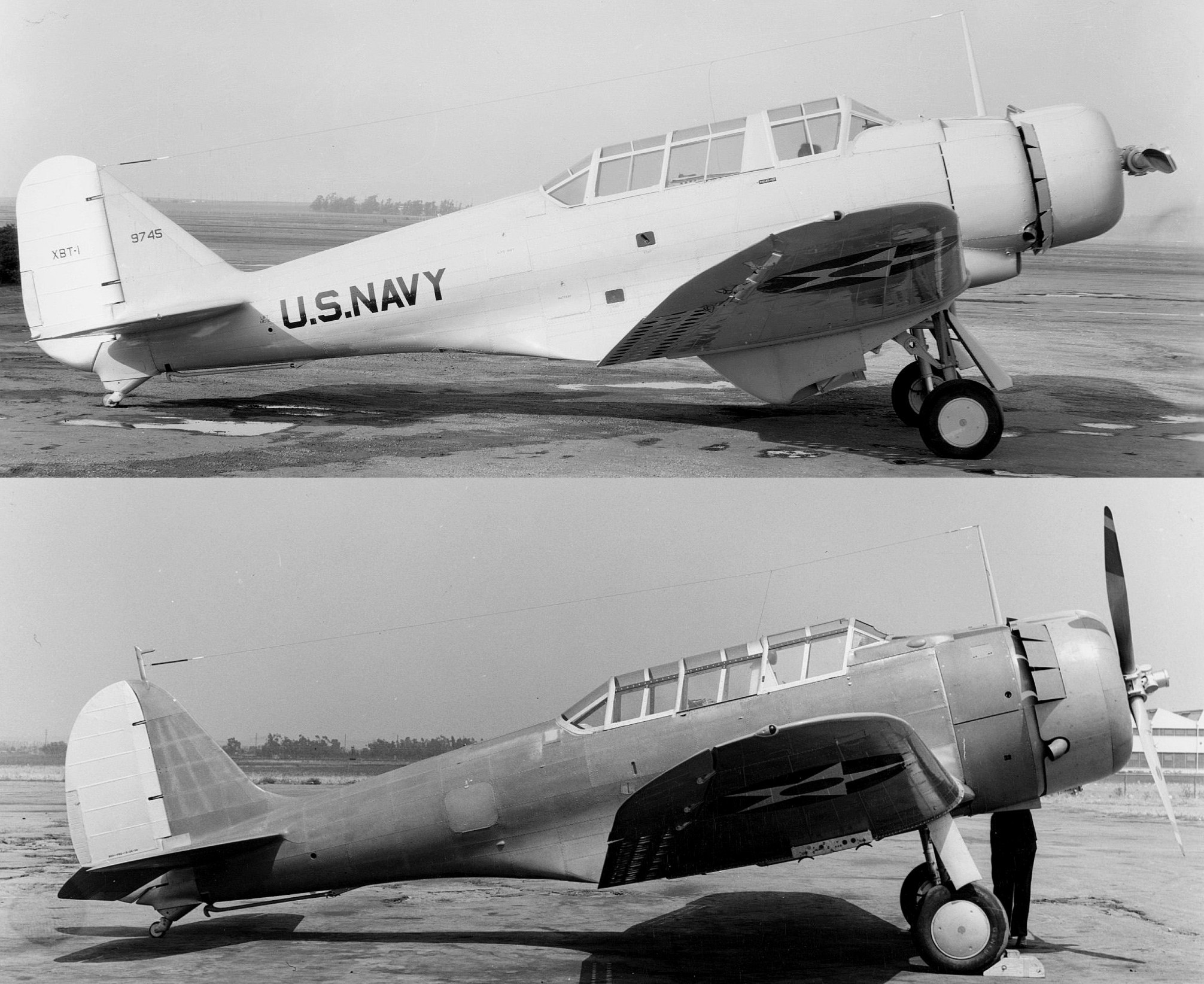
Comparison of the XBT-1 and XBT-2 (SBD)

Design work on the Northrop BT-1 began in 1935. In 1937, the Northrop Corporation was taken over by Douglas, and the active Northrop projects continued under Douglas Aircraft Corporation. The Northrop BT-2 was developed from the BT-1 by modifications ordered in November 1937, and provided the basis of the SBD, which first entered service in mid-1939. Ed Heinemann led a team of designers who considered a development with a 1,000 hp (750 kW) Wright Cyclone engine. The plane was developed at the Douglas El Segundo, California, plant, and that facility, along with the company's Oklahoma City plant, built almost all the SBDs produced. One year earlier, both the U.S. Navy and Marine Corps had placed orders for the new dive bomber, designated the SBD-1 and SBD-2 (the latter had increased fuel capacity and different armament). The SBD-1 went to the Marine Corps in late 1940, and the SBD-2 to the Navy in early 1941, replacing the SBU Corsair and Curtiss SBC Helldiver biplane squadrons on US carriers. Distinctive perforated split flaps or "dive brakes" had been incorporated into the BT-1 to eliminate tail buffeting during diving maneuvers. Unusual for carrier aircraft, folding wings were not chosen for the design, opting instead for structural strength.

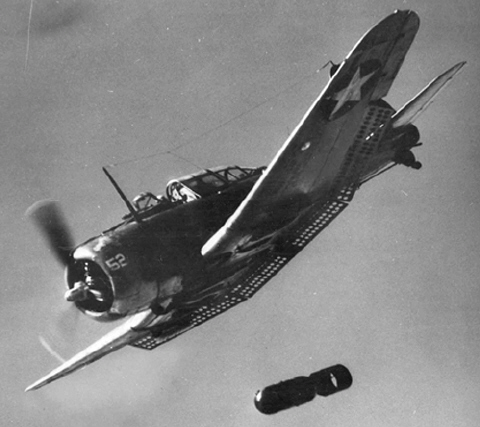
A U.S. Navy SBD releasing a bomb. The perforated surfaces deflected on the trailing edge of the wing are dive brakes

The next version was the SBD-3, which began manufacture in early 1941. It had increased armor, self-sealing fuel tanks, and four machine guns. The SBD-4 provided a 12-volt (up from 6-volt) electrical system and a few were converted into SBD-4P reconnaissance aircraft.

The next (and most produced) version, the SBD-5, was produced mostly in the Douglas plant in Tulsa, Oklahoma. This version was equipped with a 1,200 hp (890 kW) engine and an increased ammunition supply. Over 2,400 of these were built. A few of them were shipped to the Royal Navy for evaluation. In addition to American service, the SBD saw combat against the Japanese Army and Navy with No. 25 Squadron of the Royal New Zealand Air Force, but the RNZAF soon replaced them with the larger, faster, heavier. and land-based Vought F4U Corsairs.

Some SBDs were also flown by the Free French Air Force against the German Heer and Luftwaffe. SBDs were also sold to Mexico.

The final version, the SBD-6, had more improvements, but its production ended during the summer of 1944.

The U.S. Army Air Forces (USAAF) had its own version of the SBD, called the A-24 Banshee. It lacked the tail hook used for carrier landings and a pneumatic tire replaced the solid tail wheel. First assigned to the 27th Bombardment Group (Light) at Hunter Field, Georgia, A-24s flew in the Louisiana maneuvers of September 1941. The three versions of the Banshee (A-24, A-24A and A-24B) were flown by the USAAF to a very minor degree in the early stages of the war. The USAAF used 948 of the 5,937 Dauntlesses built.

== Operational history ==
=== U.S. Navy and Marine Corps ===
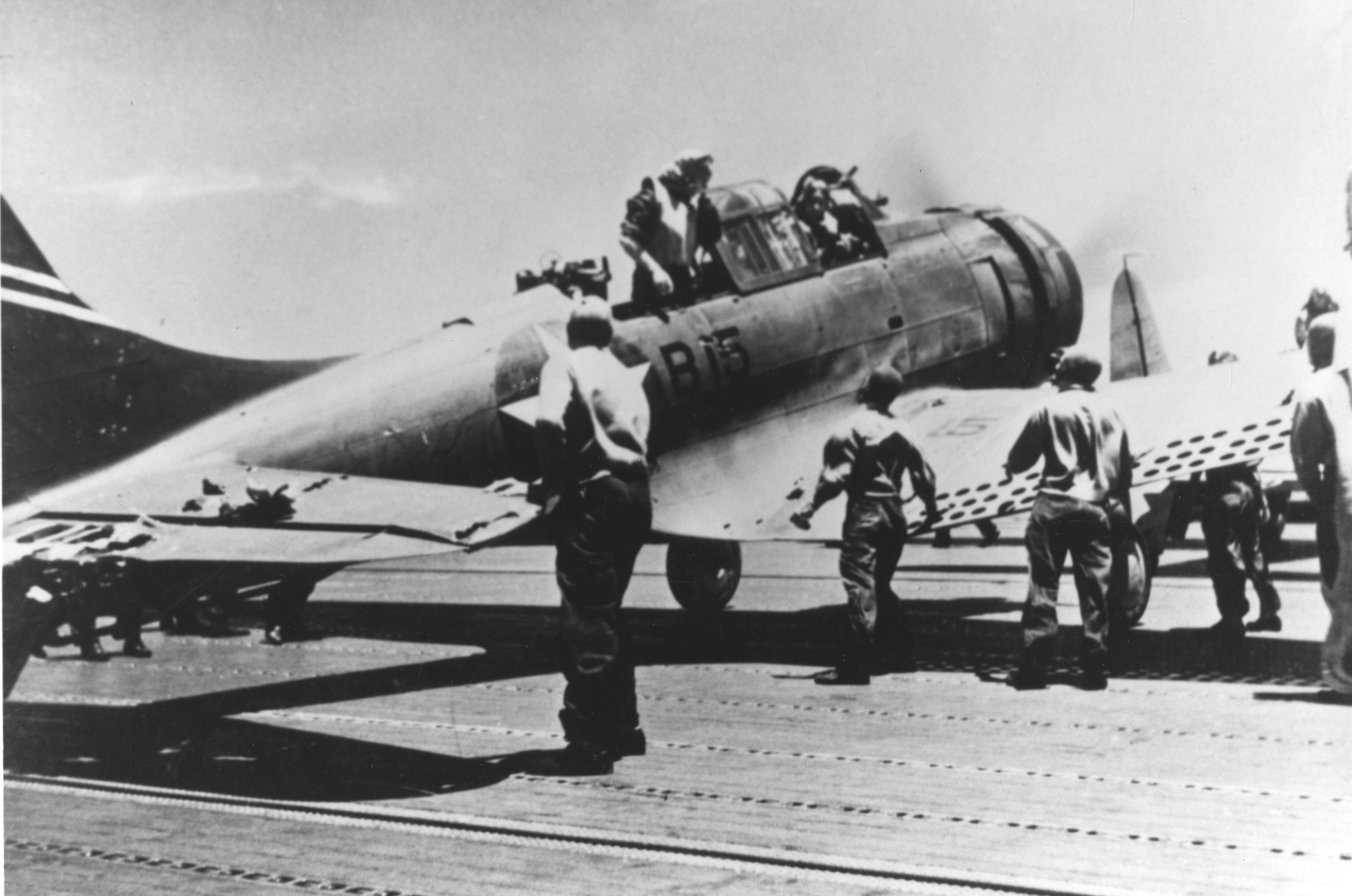
Damaged VB-6 SBD-3 on Yorktown after the attack on Kaga at Midway

U.S. Navy and Marine Corps SBDs saw their first action at Pearl Harbor, when most of the Marine Corps SBDs of Marine Scout Bombing Squadron 232 (VMSB-232) were destroyed on the ground at Ewa Mooring Mast Field. Most U.S. Navy SBDs flew from their aircraft carriers, which did not operate in close cooperation with the rest of the fleet. Most Navy SBDs at Pearl Harbor, like their Marine Corps counterparts, were destroyed on the ground. On 10 December 1941, SBDs from USS Enterprise sank the Japanese submarine I-70. In February–March 1942, SBDs from the carriers USS Lexington, USS Yorktown, and USS Enterprise, took part in various raids on Japanese installations in the Gilbert Islands, the Marshall Islands, New Guinea, Rabaul, Wake Island, and Marcus Island.

The first major use of the SBD in combat was at the Battle of the Coral Sea, where SBDs and TBD Devastators sank the Japanese light aircraft carrier (CVL) Shōhō and damaged the Japanese fleet carrier Shōkaku. SBDs were also used for antitorpedo combat air patrols, and these scored several victories against Japanese aircraft trying to attack Lexington and Yorktown. Their relatively heavy gun armament with two forward-firing .50 in (12.7 mm) M2 Browning machine guns and either one or two rear flexible-mount .30 in (7.62 mm) AN/M2 machine guns was effective against the lightly built Japanese fighters, and many pilots and gunners took aggressive attitudes to the fighters that attacked them. SBD pilot Stanley "Swede" Vejtasa was attacked by three A6M2 Zero fighters; he shot down two of them and cut off the wing of the third in a head-on pass with his wingtip. (Note: Vejtasa's skill thus having been clearly demonstrated, he was transferred to fighters; in October 1942, he shot down seven enemy aircraft in one day.)

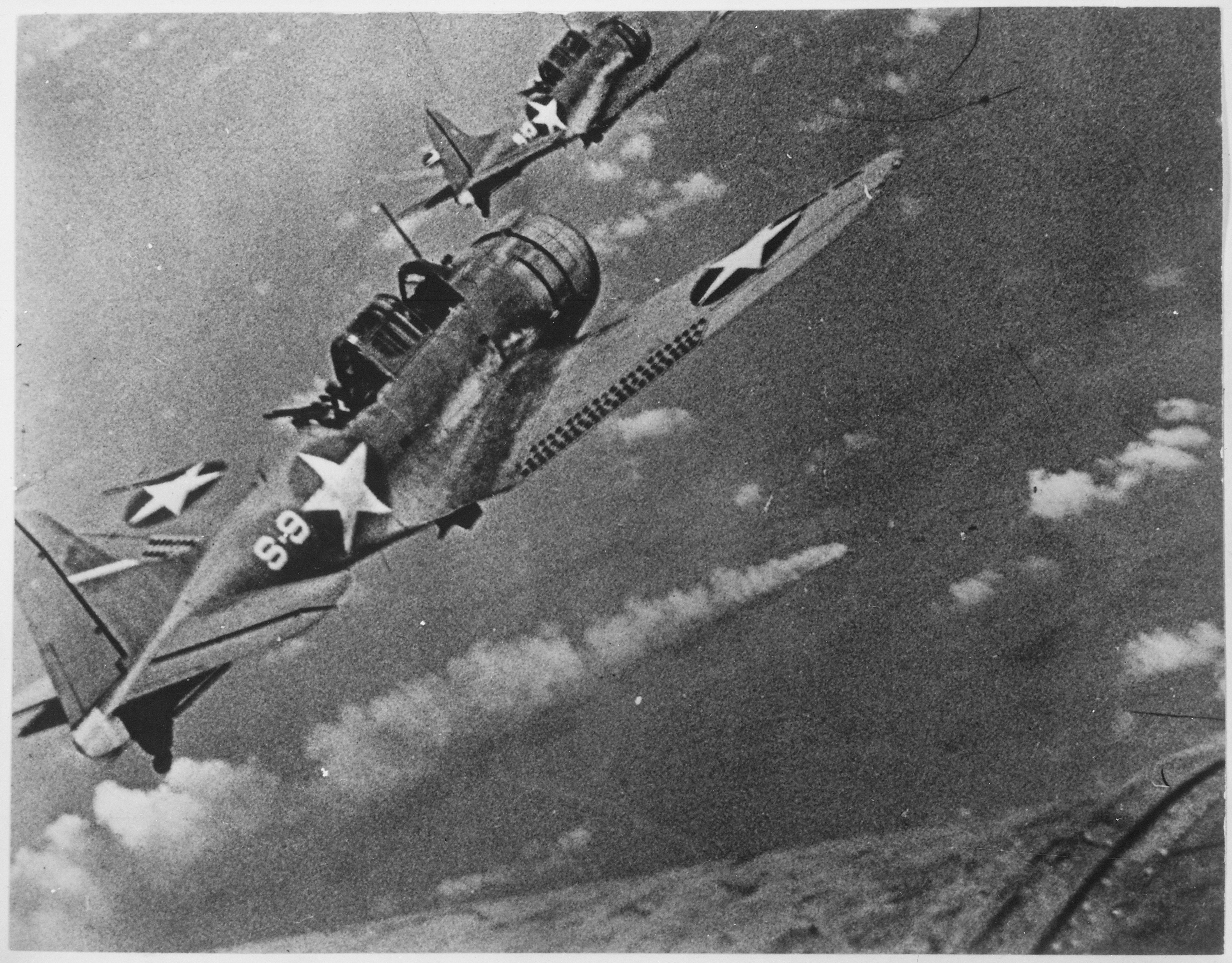
SBD-3's from Scouting Squadron 8 (VS-8) aboard Hornet approach the burning heavy cruiser Mikuma on 6 June 1942 during the Battle of Midway

The SBD's most important contribution to the American war effort came during the Battle of Midway in early June 1942. Three squadrons of Navy SBD dive bombers attacked and sank or fatally damaged all four Japanese fleet carriers present, disabling three of them in the span of just 6 minutes (Akagi, Kaga, Sōryū), and later in the day, Hiryū. Joined by additional planes from the Hornet they also caught two straggling heavy cruisers of the Midway bombardment group of four, heavily damaging them, with Mikuma eventually sinking.

At the Battle of Midway, Marine Corps SBDs were not as effective. One squadron, VMSB-241, flying from Midway Atoll, was not trained in the techniques of dive bombing with their new Dauntlesses (having just partially converted from the SB2U Vindicator). Its pilots resorted to the slower but easier glide bombing technique. This led to many of the SBDs being shot down during their glide, although one survivor from these attacks, now on display at the National Naval Aviation Museum, is the last surviving aircraft to have flown in the battle. The carrier-borne squadrons were effective, especially when they were escorted by Grumman F4F Wildcats. The success of dive bombing resulted from one important factor,

Unlike American squadrons that attacked shortly before one at a time, allowing defending Japanese Zero fighters to concentrate on each squadron to shoot them down or drive them away from the carriers, three squadrons totaling 47 SBDs (VS-6, VB-6, and VB-3), one squadron of 12 TBD torpedo aircraft (VT-3), and six F4F fighters (from VF-3) all arrived simultaneously, with two of the SBD squadrons (VS-6 and VB-6) arriving from a different direction from the other squadrons. Without central fighter direction, the approximately 40 Zeros concentrated on the TBDs, with some fighting the F4Fs covering the TBDs, leaving the SBDs unhindered by fighter opposition in their approach and attack (although most of the TBDs were shot down).

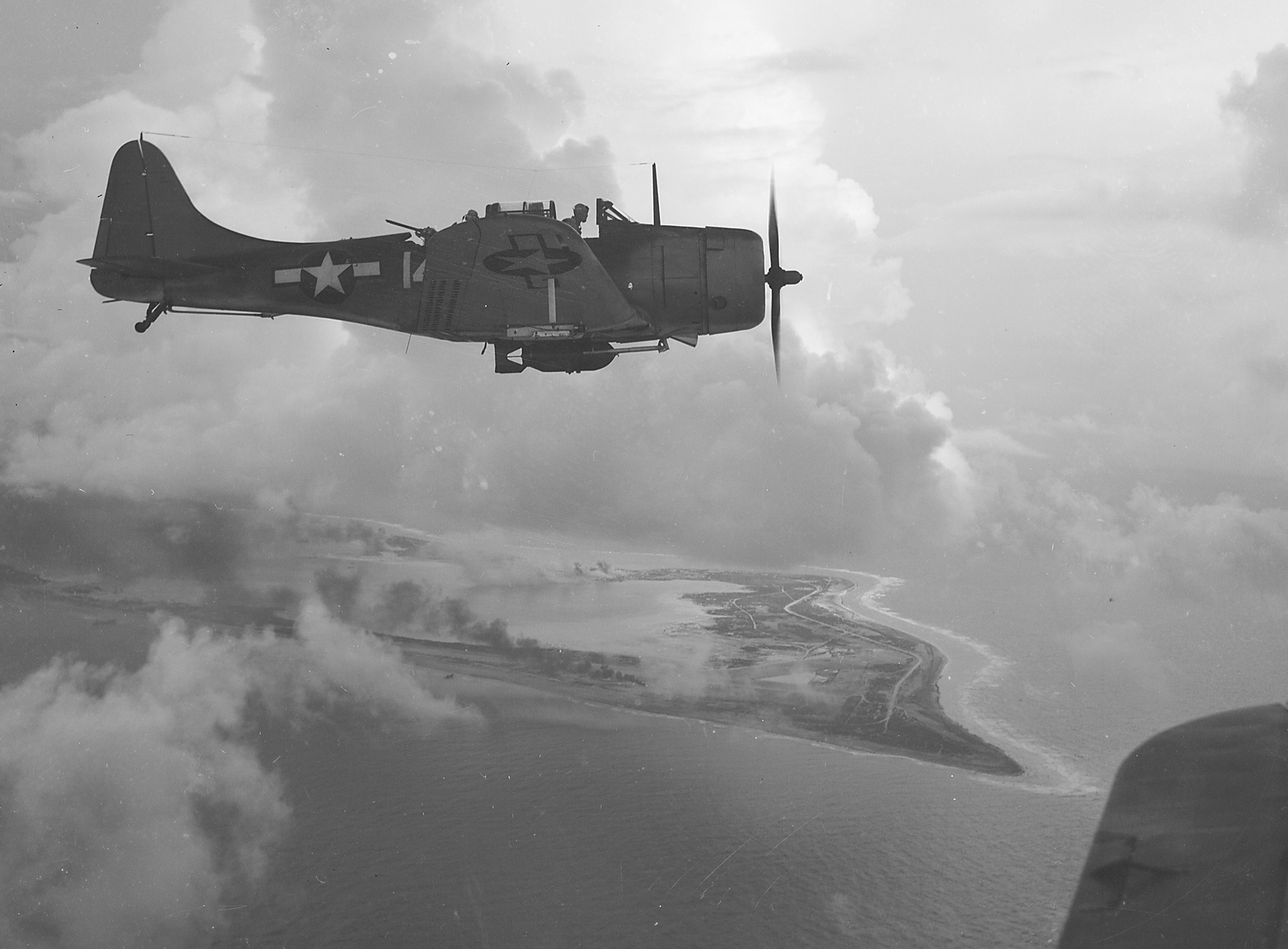
A VB-5 SBD from Yorktown over Wake, early October 1943

SBDs played a major role in the Guadalcanal campaign, operating off both American carriers and from Henderson Field on Guadalcanal. SBDs proved lethal to Japanese shipping that failed to clear New Georgia Sound (the Slot) by daylight. Losses inflicted included the carrier Ryūjō, sunk near the Solomon Islands on 24 August. Three other Japanese carriers were damaged during the six-month campaign. SBDs sank a cruiser and nine transports during the Naval Battle of Guadalcanal.

In the Atlantic Ocean, the SBD saw action during Operation Torch, the Allied landings in North Africa in November 1942. The SBDs flew from USS Ranger and two escort carriers. Eleven months later, during Operation Leader, the SBDs had their European debut, when aircraft from Ranger attacked Nazi German shipping around Bodø, Norway.

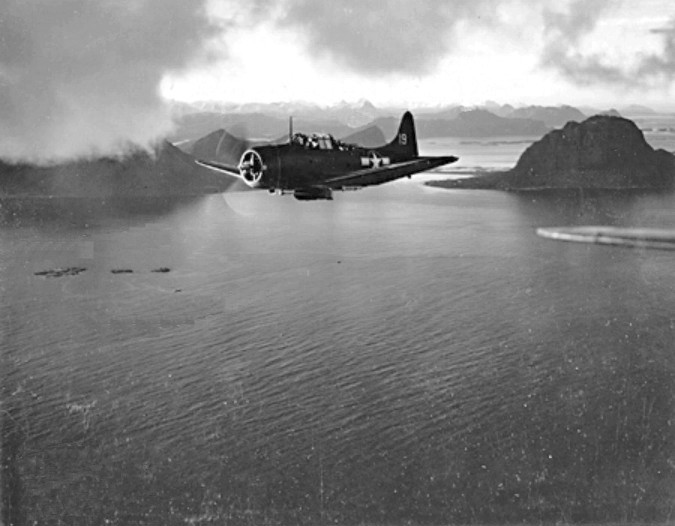
A VB-4 SBD near Bodø, Norway, 4 October 1943

By 1944, the U.S. Navy began replacing the SBD with the more powerful SB2C Helldiver. During the Battle of the Philippine Sea in June 1944, a long-range, twilight strike was made against the retreating Japanese fleet, at (or beyond) the limit of the combat radius of the aircraft. The force had about 20 minutes of daylight over their targets before attempting the long return in the dark. Of the 215 aircraft, only 115 made it back. Twenty were lost to enemy action in the attack, and 80 were lost as one-by-one they expended their fuel and had to ditch into the sea. In the attack were 26 SBDs, all of which made it back to the carriers.

The Battle of the Philippine Sea was the last major engagement of the carrier-borne SBDs. Marine squadrons continued to fly SBDs until the end of the war. Although the Curtiss Helldiver had a more powerful engine, a higher maximum speed, and could carry nearly 1000 pounds more in bomb load, many of the dive bomber pilots preferred the SBD, which was lighter and had better low-speed handling characteristics, critical for carrier landings.

The Dauntless was one of the most important aircraft in the Pacific War, sinking more enemy shipping in the Pacific than any other Allied bomber. Barrett Tillman, in his book on the Dauntless, claims that it has a "plus" score against enemy aircraft, meaning it was credited with more victories over enemy planes than losses from enemy action. This is considered to be a rare event for a nominal "bomber".

A total of 5,936 SBDs was produced during the war. The last SBD rolled off the assembly lines at the Douglas Aircraft plant in El Segundo, California, on 21 July 1944. The Navy placed emphasis on the heavier, faster, and longer-ranged SB2C. From Pearl Harbor through April 1944, SBDs had flown 1,189,473 operational hours, with 25% of all operational hours flown off aircraft carriers being in SBDs. Its battle record shows that in addition to six Japanese carriers, 14 enemy cruisers had been sunk, along with six destroyers, 15 transports or cargo ships, and scores of various lesser craft.

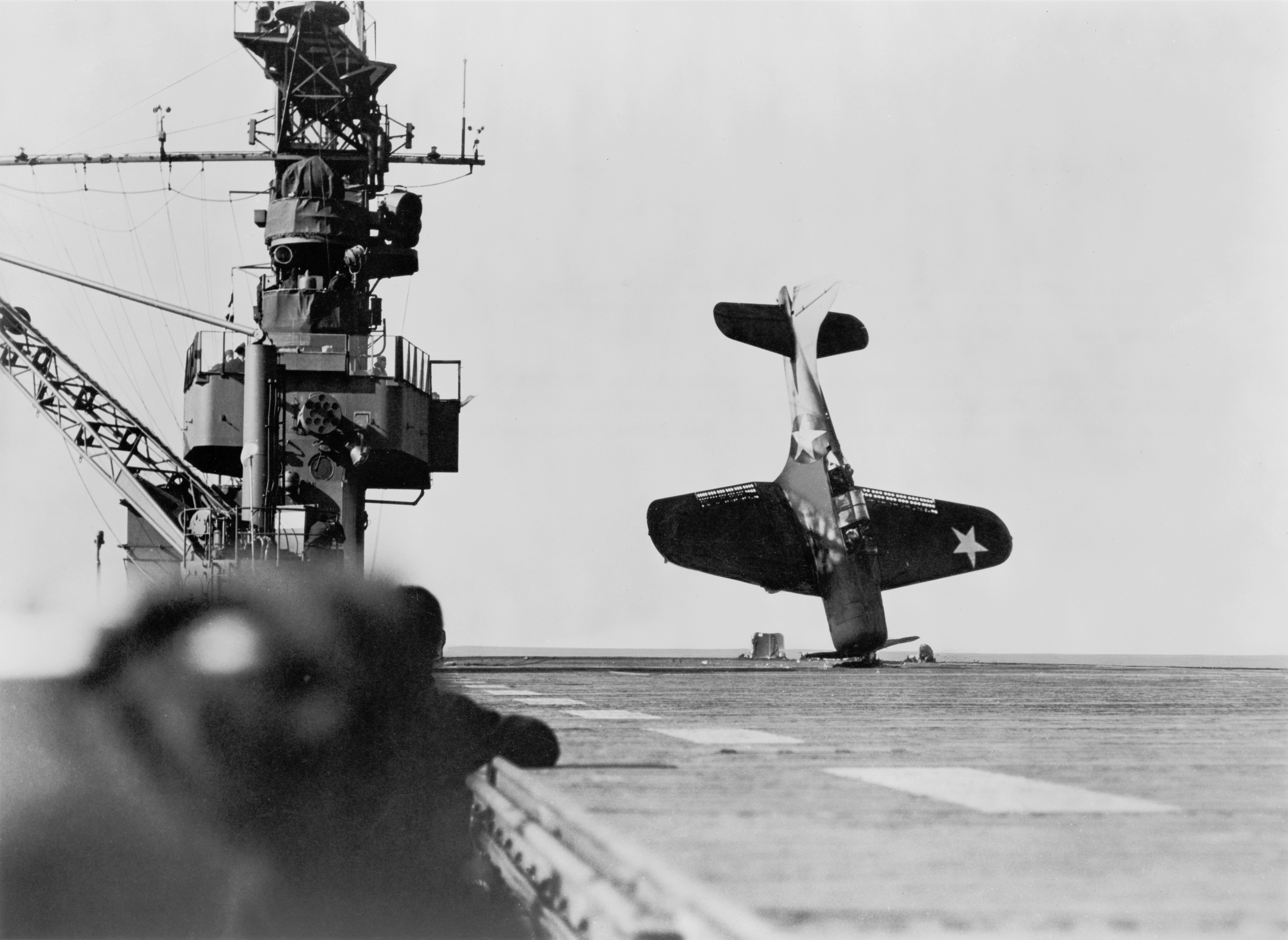
SBD-3 balanced on its nose after a carrier crash landing

=== Medal of Honor recipients ===
Two SBD pilots received the Medal of Honor during World War II, with both during the Battle of the Coral Sea:

- USN Lt. (j.g.) William E. Hall of Scouting Squadron 2 on USS Lexington (CV-2) was awarded the Medal of Honor for his action during the Battle of the Coral Sea on 7–8 May 1942. On 7 May, Hall participated in the attack that sank the Japanese light carrier Shōhō. The following day, while flying anti-torpedo plane patrol in defense of his carrier, he attacked a formation of Japanese torpedo bombers, shooting down the lead plane and forcing the remaining planes to alter their attack. Shortly afterward, Hall was attacked by several A6M Zeros. Despite being seriously wounded and his SBD heavily damaged in the ensuing dogfight, he claimed two Zeros shot down (though none were lost) and succeeded in landing safely aboard Lexington.
- USN Lt. John James Powers of Bombing Squadron 5 on USS Yorktown (CV-5) was posthumously awarded the Medal of Honor for his actions during the Battle of the Coral Sea from 4–8 May 1942. Powers participated in three attacks against Japanese forces near Tulagi on 4 May, scoring a direct hit that destroyed a Japanese gunboat or destroyer and near misses that damaged an aircraft tender and a transport ship. During the attacks he also strafed an enemy gunboat under intense anti-aircraft fire, leaving it heavily damaged. On 7 May, he led a section of three dive bombers in the attack that sank the Japanese light carrier Shōhō. Disregarding heavy antiaircraft fire and diving below the recommended release altitude, he scored a direct hit that caused a massive explosion aboard the carrier. Powers openly advocated extremely low-altitude bombing attacks despite the grave risks involved, believing such tactics were necessary to ensure accuracy. On 8 May, during the attack on the Japanese carrier force, he again pressed home his dive-bombing attack through heavy fire and enemy fighters, releasing his bomb at extremely low altitude to ensure a direct hit on an enemy carrier. He was last seen attempting to pull out of his dive at approximately 200 feet amid explosions, smoke and debris from the stricken ship, and was killed in action.

=== United States Army Air Forces ===
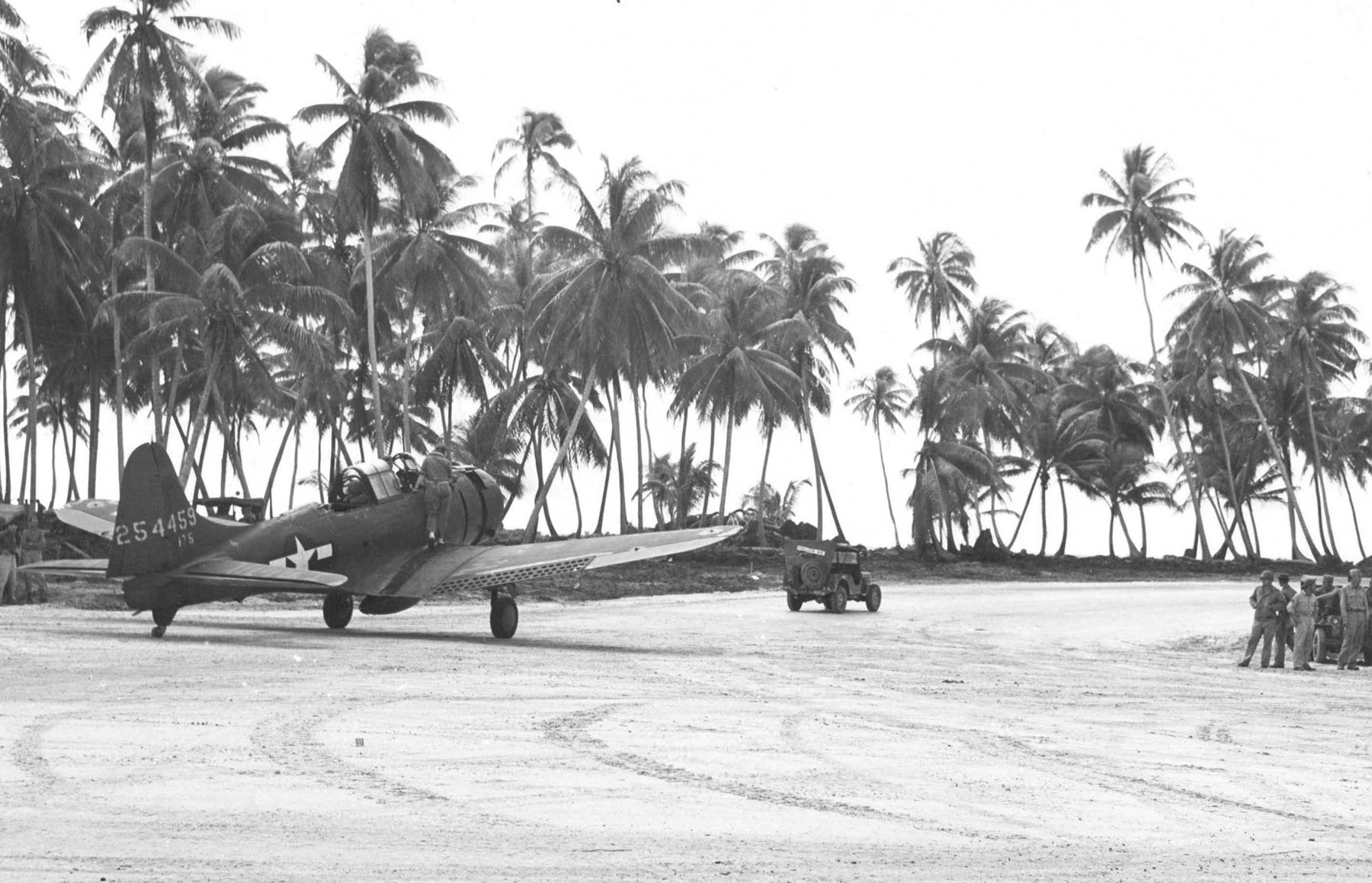
A-24B taxiing at Makin Island, 1943

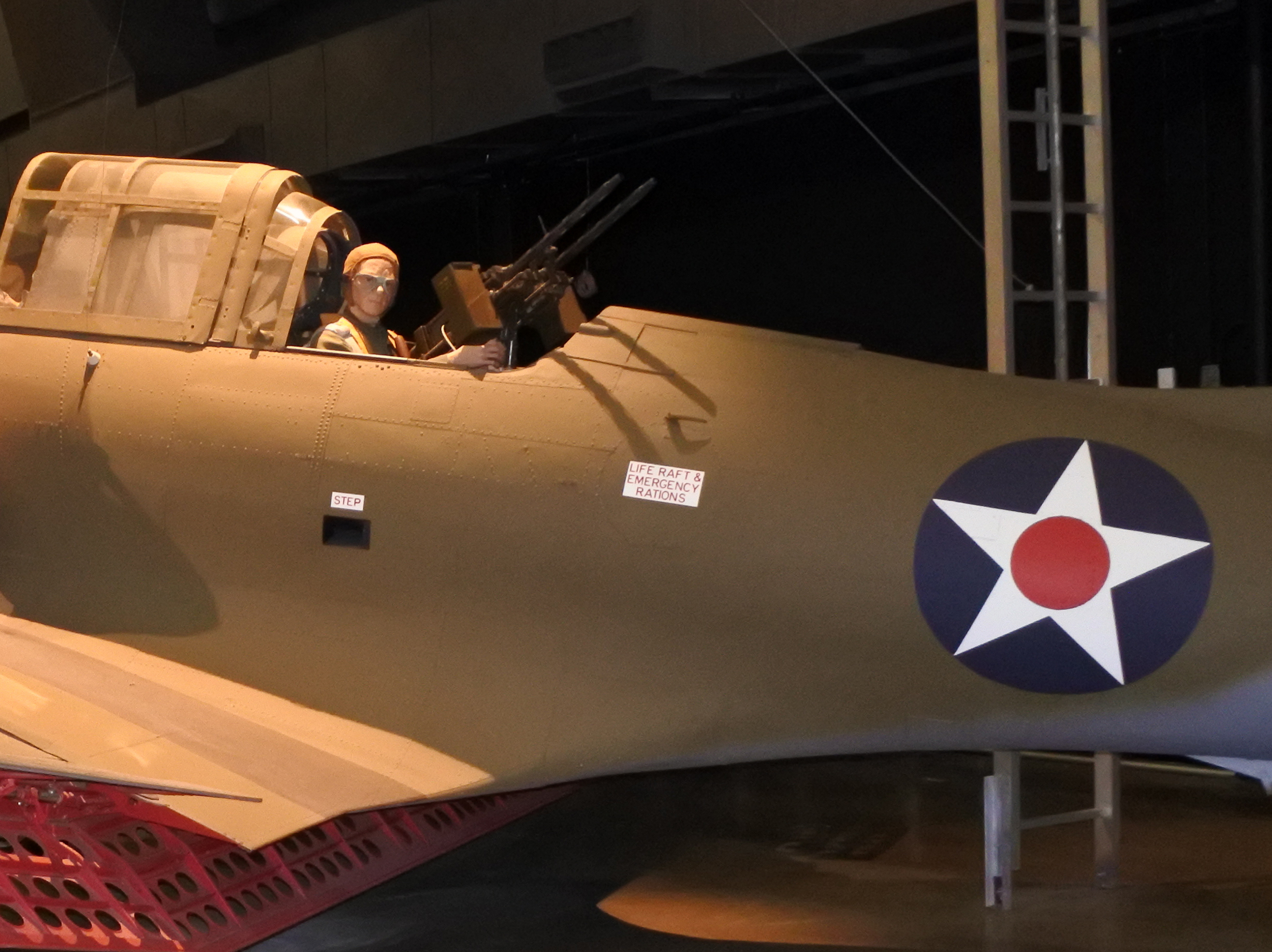
Rear gunner position on A-24 displayed at the National Museum of the United States Air Force

The USAAF sent 52 A-24 Banshees in crates to the Philippines in the fall of 1941 to equip the 27th Bombardment Group, whose personnel were sent separately. However, after the Japanese attack on Pearl Harbor, these bombers were diverted to Australia and the 27th BG fought on the Bataan Peninsula as infantry. While in Australia, the aircraft were reassembled for flight to the Philippines, but missing parts, including solenoids, trigger motors, and gun mounts, delayed their shipment. Plagued with mechanical problems, the A-24s were diverted to the 91st Bombardment Squadron and designated for assignment to Java, instead.

Referring to themselves as "Blue Rock Clay Pigeons" (after a brand of trap shooting targets), the 91st BS based at Malang attacked the enemy-held harbor and airbase at Bali and damaged or sank numerous ships around Java during the Dutch East Indies campaign. After the Japanese downed two A-24s and damaged three so badly that they could no longer fly, the 91st received orders to evacuate Java in early March 1942.

The A-24s remaining in Australia were assigned to the 8th Bombardment Squadron of 3d Bombardment Group, to defend New Guinea. On 29 July 1942, seven A-24s attacked a convoy off Buna, but only one survived; the Japanese shot down five of them and damaged the sixth so badly that it did not make it back to base. Regarded by many pilots as too slow, short ranged, and poorly armed, the remaining A-24s were relegated to noncombat missions. In the U.S., the A-24s became training aircraft or towed targets for aerial gunnery training. The more powerful A-24B was used later against the Japanese forces in the Gilbert Islands. From December 1943 until March 1944, the 531st Fighter Squadron of the 7th Air Force flew A-24Bs from Makin Island in the Gilbert Islands against Japanese-controlled islands in the Marshall Islands. The A-24Bs were then withdrawn from combat.

The A-24B (equivalent to the U.S. Navy SBD-5, with the omission of the arrestor hook) arrived in 1943 with the more powerful 1,200 hp Wright R-1820-60 Cyclone engine, a more powerful engine than either the A-24 or A-24A. As a result, the A-24B could fly slightly faster and higher than the earlier models. The A-24B lacked the small air intake on the top of the engine cowling present on the earlier models, which is an easy way to distinguish the B model. The 407th Bomb Group, assigned to the 11th Air Force, flew A-24Bs against the Japanese-held island of Kiska, Alaska, during July and August 1943.

A handful of A-24s survived in the inventory of the USAAF long enough to be taken over by the Air Force (USAF) when that service became independent of the Army in September 1947. The USAF established a new designation system for its aircraft, eliminating the "A-" (for attack) category (through 1962); all of the single-engined "A-" aircraft were given "F-" (for fighter) nomenclature (or were determined to be obsolete and scrapped); thus, the few remaining A-24 Banshees became known as F-24 Banshees, soldiering on in a reserve role until 1950, when they were scrapped.

=== French Air Force and Naval Aviation (Aeronavale) ===
The first production Dauntless sent into action was the SBD-3, which was produced for the French Naval Aviation. A total of 174 Dauntlesses was ordered by the French Navy, but with the fall of France in the spring of 1940, that production batch was diverted to the U.S. Navy, which ordered 410 more.

The Free French received about 80 SBD-5s and A-24Bs from the United States in 1944. They were used as trainers and close-support aircraft.

- Free French squadrons received 40 to 50 A-24Bs in Morocco and Algeria during 1943.
- French Naval Aviation (Aeronautique Navale) received 32 in late 1944 for Flotilles 3FB and 4FB (16 SBD-5s for each).

Squadron I/17 Picardie used a few A-24Bs for coastal patrol. The most combat-experienced of the Banshee units was GC 1/18 Vendee, which flew A-24Bs in support of Allied forces in southern France and also experienced how deadly German flak was, losing several aircraft in 1944. This squadron flew from North Africa to recently liberated Toulouse to support Allied and French resistance troops. Later, the unit was assigned to support attacks on cities occupied by the Germans on the French Atlantic coast. In April 1945, each SBD-5 averaged three missions a day in the European theater. In 1946, the French Air Force based its A-24Bs in Morocco as trainers.

French Navy Dauntlesses were based in Cognac at the end of 1944. The French Navy Dauntlesses were the last ones to see combat, during the Indochina War, flying from the carrier Arromanches (the former Royal Navy carrier Colossus). In late 1947 during one operation in the Indochina War, Flotille 4F flew 200 missions and dropped 65 tons of bombs. By 1949, the French Navy removed the Dauntless from combat status, although the type was still flown as a trainer through 1953.

=== Royal New Zealand Air Force ===
In 1943, the Royal New Zealand Air Force received several SBD-3s and SBD-4s for use in training by No. 25 Squadron. The following year, the squadron used the SBD-5 in combat operations during the Solomon Islands campaign. It had been intended to equip four squadrons of the RNZAF with the Dauntless, but only No. 25 Squadron used them. The RNZAF soon replaced them with F4U Corsairs.

== Variants ==
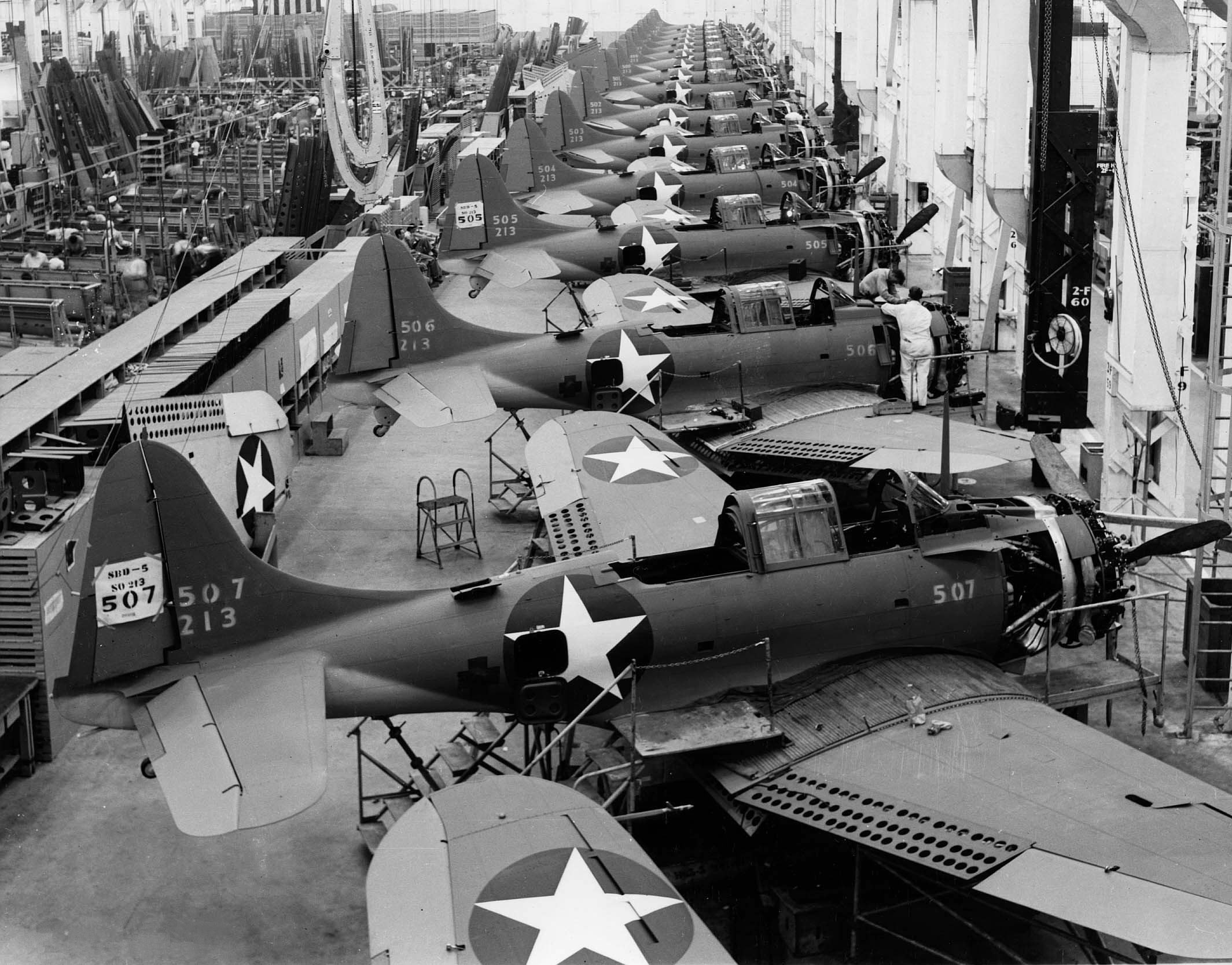
SBD-5 production at El Segundo, 1943

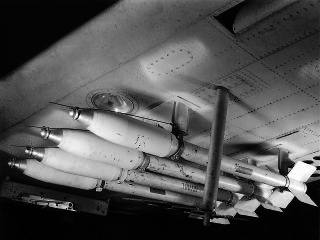
FFARs mounted on a SBD for testing, 1944

XBT-2
prototype, airframe was a production Northrop BT-1 heavily modified and redesignated as the XBT-2. Further modified by Douglas as the XSBD-1.
SBD-1
Marine Corps version without self-sealing fuel tanks; 57 built.
SBD-1P
reconnaissance aircraft, converted from SBD-1s.
SBD-2
Navy version with increased fuel capacity and different armament but without self-sealing fuel tanks, starting in early 1941; 87 built.
SBD-2P
reconnaissance aircraft, converted from SBD-2s.
SBD-3
began to be manufactured in early 1941. This provided increased protection, self-sealing fuel tanks, and four machine guns; 584 were built.
SBD-4
provided a 24-volt (up from 12 volt) electrical system; In addition, a new propeller and fuel pumps rounded out the improvements over the SBD-3. 780 built.
SBD-4P
reconnaissance aircraft, converted from SBD-4s.
SBD-5
The most produced version, primarily produced at the Douglas Aircraft plant in Tulsa, Oklahoma. Equipped with a 1,200-hp engine and an increased ammunition supply. A total of 2,965 were built, and a few were shipped to the Royal Navy for evaluation. In addition to American service, these saw combat against the Japanese with No. 25 Squadron of the Royal New Zealand Air Force which soon replaced them with F4Us, and against the Luftwaffe with the Free French Air Force. A few were also sent to Mexico.
SBD-5A
as A-24B, for USAAF but delivered to USMC; 60 built.
SBD-6
The final version, providing more improvements, including a 1,350 hp (1,010 kW) engine, but production ended in the summer of 1944; 450 built.
A-24 Banshee (SBD-3A)
USAAF equivalent of the SBD-3 without arrestor hook; 168 built.
A-24A Banshee (SBD-4A)
USAAF equivalent of the SBD-4; 170 built.
A-24B Banshee (SBD-5A)
USAAF equivalent of the SBD-5; 615 built.

== Operators ==
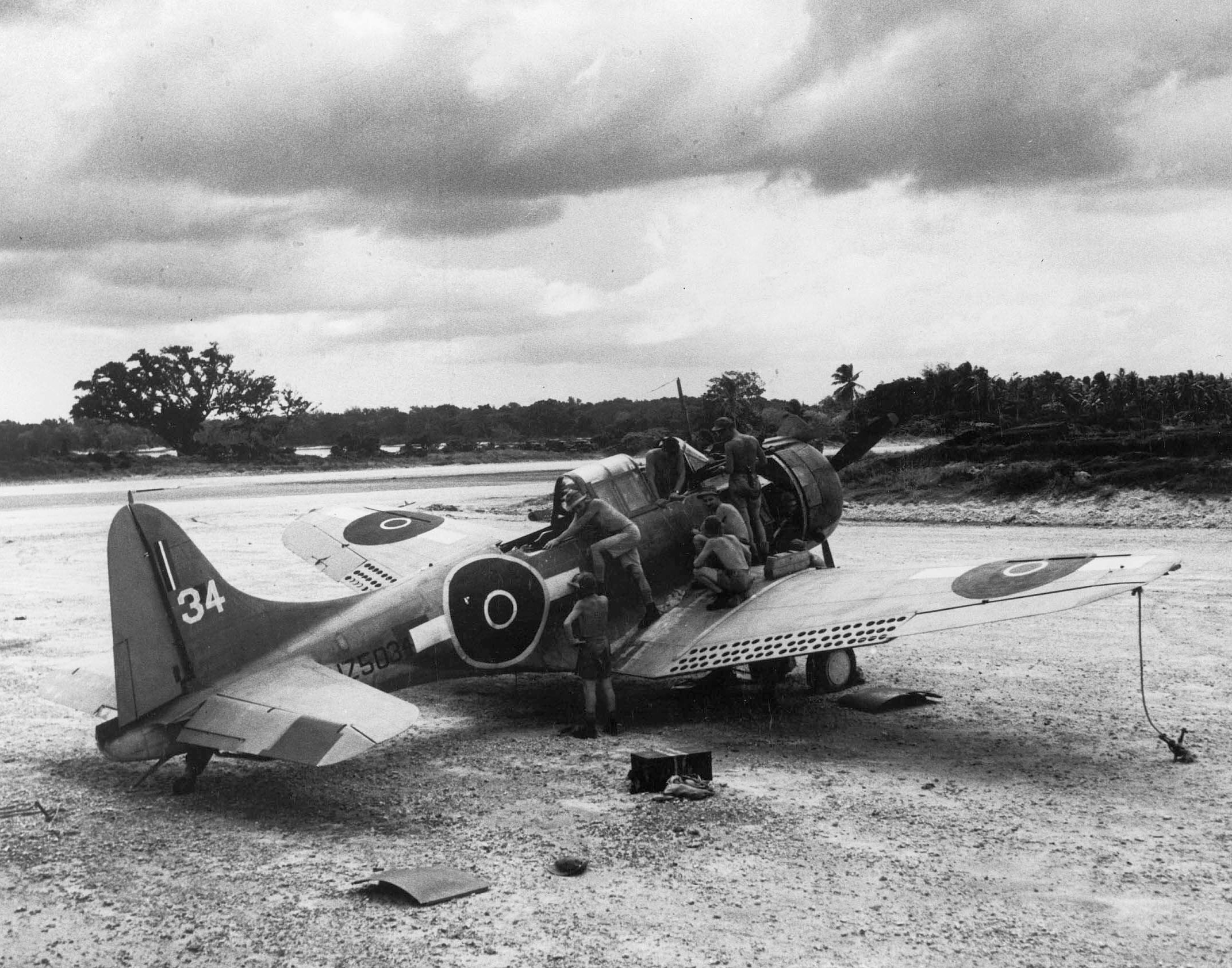
A No. 25 Squadron RNZAF SBD-4 on Espiritu Santo, 1944

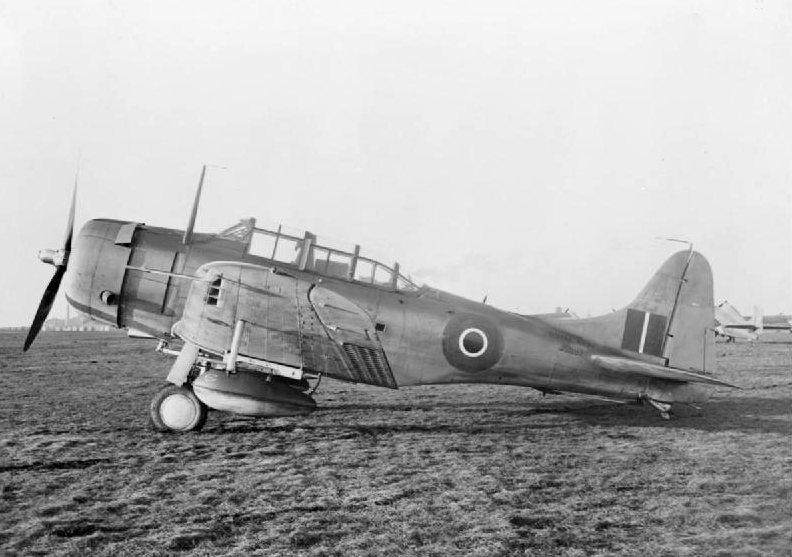
One of nine SBD-5s supplied to the Royal Navy

Chile

- Chilean Air Force operated A-24B Banshees.

France

- French Air Force
- French Navy

Mexico

- Mexican Air Force

Morocco

- Moroccan Desert Police

New Zealand

- Royal New Zealand Air Force
  - No. 25 Squadron RNZAF

United Kingdom

- Royal Air Force received aircraft for evaluation from the nine originally tested by the Fleet Air Arm.
- Royal Navy Fleet Air Arm received nine former United States Navy SBD-5s for evaluation.

United States

- United States Army Air Forces
  - 339th Bombardment Group (Dive), as operational training unit in 1942–1943
- United States Marine Corps
- United States Navy

== Notable accidents ==
- On 7 December 1943, during a joint U.S. Navy–U.S. Marine simulated close air support exercise near Pauwela, Maui, Territory of Hawaii, the pilot of a U.S. Navy SBD-5, BuNo 36045 of squadron VB-10, initiated a slight right-hand turn and deployed dive brakes in preparation for a bomb run, but his aircraft was struck by a second VB-10 SBD-5, 36099, that did not have dive brakes deployed. Both aircraft crashed, and a bomb knocked loose from 36045 fell in the midst of a group of marines and detonated, killing 20 and seriously injuring 24. Both SBD pilots parachuted to safety, but both SBD gunners died, one after an unsuccessful bailout attempt. The collision was attributed to poor judgment and flying technique by both pilots. Aviation Archaeology Investigation & Research gives the date of this accident as 6 December.

== Surviving aircraft ==
The hyphenated numbers are original U.S. Army Air Forces Serial Numbers (AAF Ser. No.); four- or five-digit numbers are original U.S. Navy Bureau of Aeronautics Bureau Numbers.

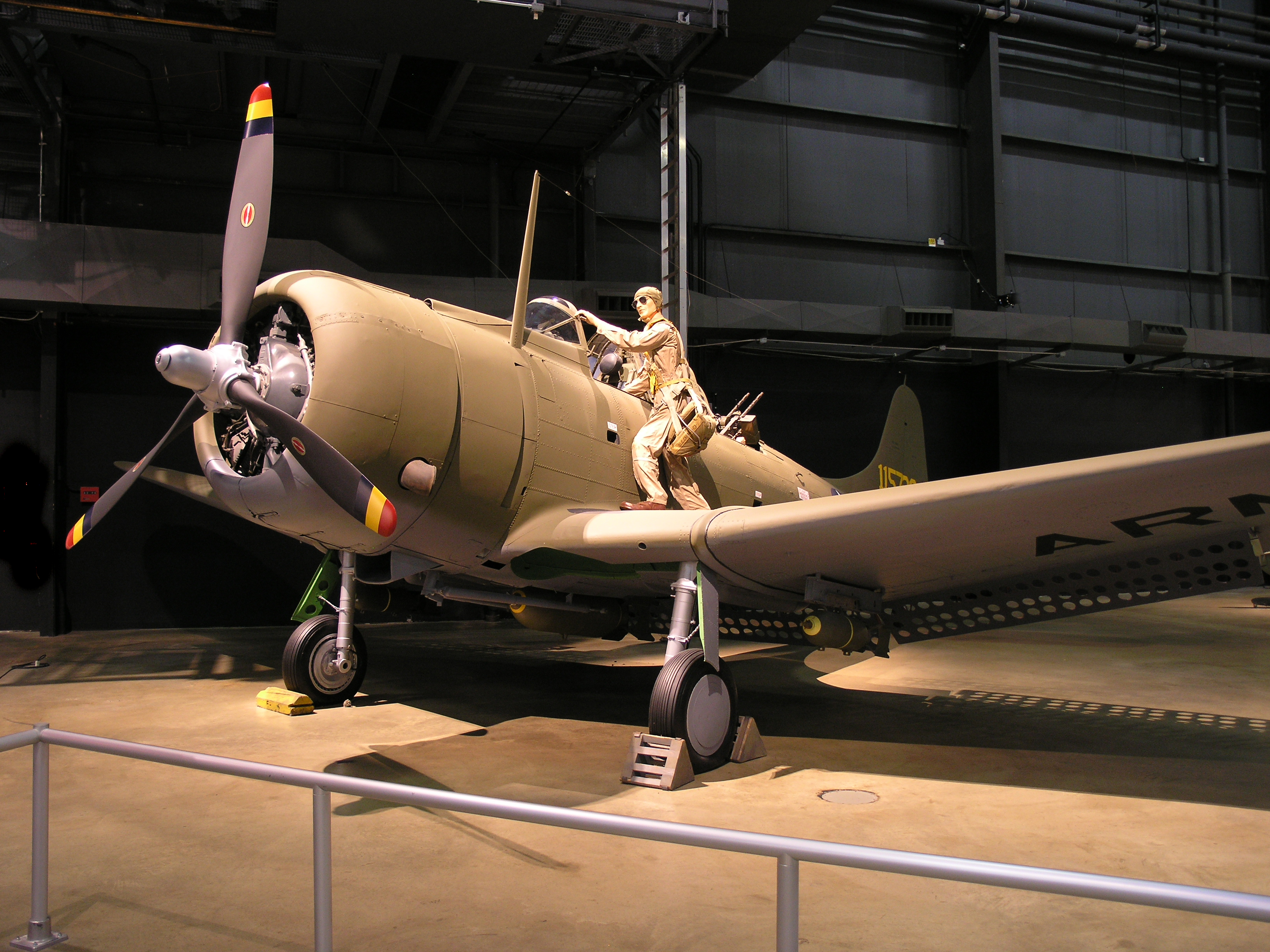
A-24 at the National Museum of the United States Air Force

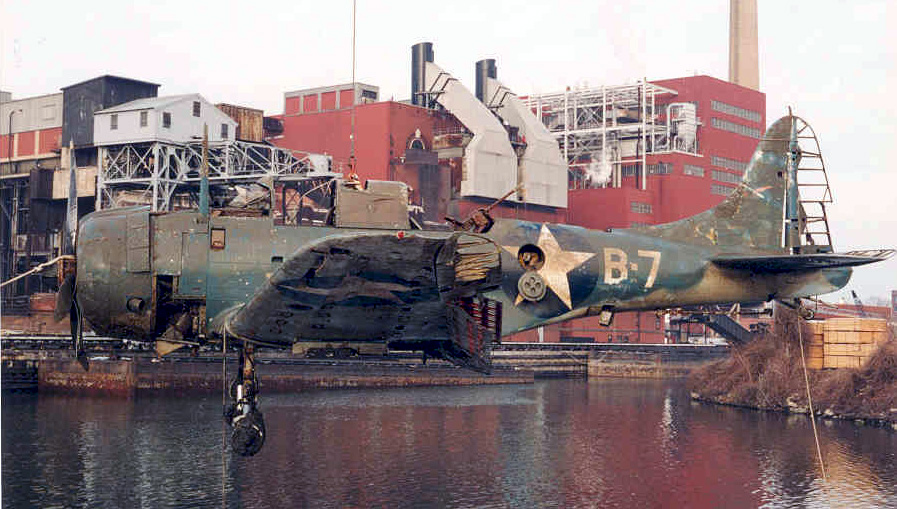
SBD-2, BuNo 2106, a Battle of Midway veteran, later returned to United States as a carrier-qualification training aircraft. Ditched in Lake Michigan while attempting to land aboard USS Sable (IX-81), 1943, it was recovered from Lake Michigan in 1994. Totally restored, it was placed on display at the National Naval Aviation Museum in 2001.

=== New Zealand ===
On display

SBD-4

- 06853 – Royal New Zealand Air Force Museum in Christchurch.

=== Solomon Islands ===
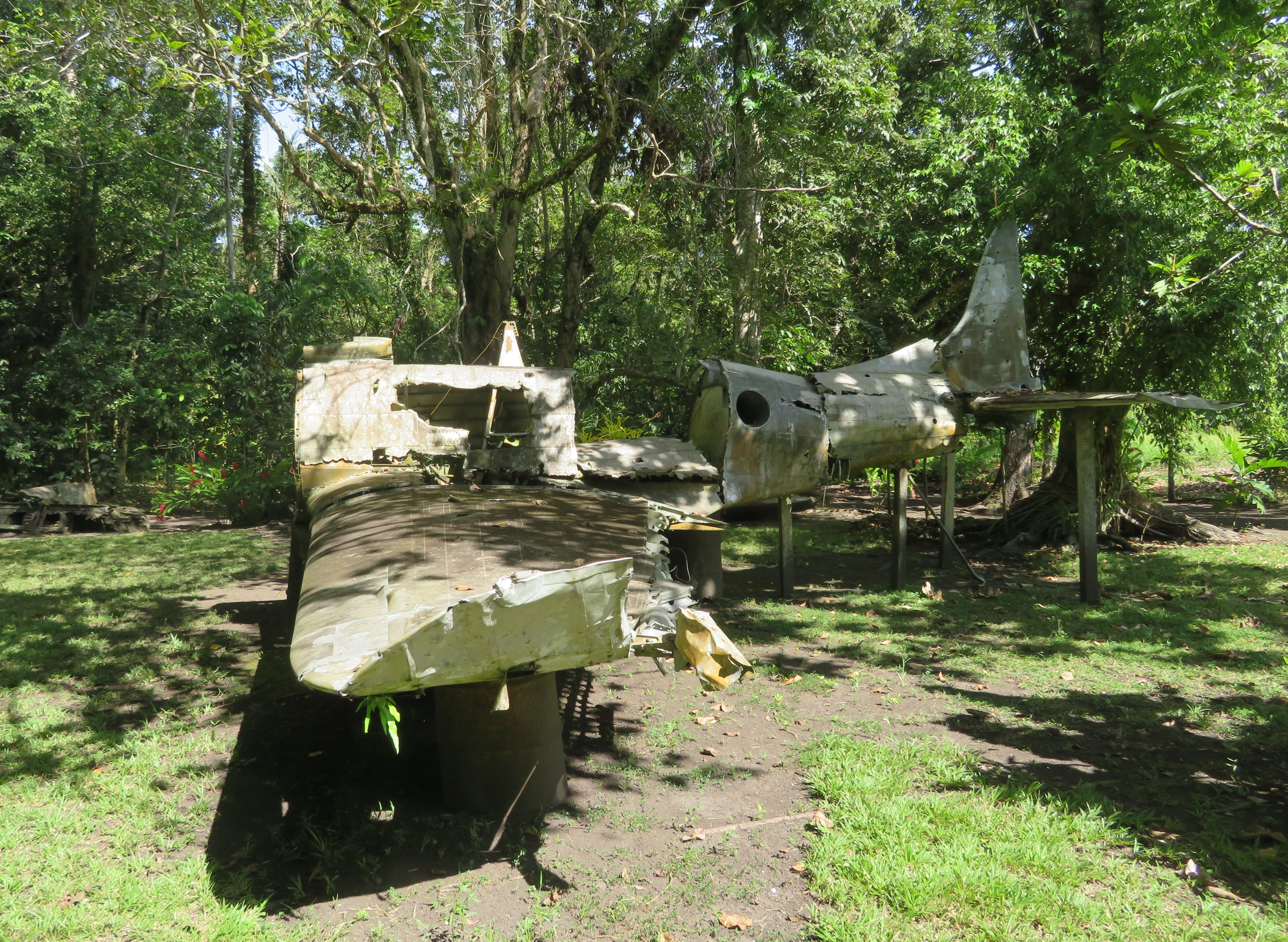
SBD at the Vilu War Museum in Guadalcanal

On display

SBD-?

- Unknown – Vilu Military Museum in Guadalcanal.

=== United States ===
Airworthy

A-24A

- 42-60817 – based at the Erickson Aircraft Collection in Madras, Oregon as an SBD-3.

A-24B

- 42-54682 – based at the Fagen Fighters WWII Museum in Granite Falls, Minnesota as an SBD-5. Formerly based at the Lone Star Flight Museum in Houston, Texas.

SBD-4

- 10518 – based at the Yanks Air Museum in Chino, California.
- 10694 – based at the National Museum of World War II Aviation in Colorado Springs, Colorado.

SBD-5

- 28536 – based at the Planes of Fame in Chino, California.
- 54532 – Lady in Blue (N82GA), based at the Commemorative Air Force – Airbase Georgia in Peachtree City, Georgia

On display

A-24B

- 42-54582 – National Museum of the United States Air Force at Wright-Patterson Air Force Base in Dayton, Ohio.
- 42-54654 – Pima Air & Space Museum, adjacent to Davis-Monthan Air Force Base, Tucson, Arizona.

SBD-2

- 02106 – National Naval Aviation Museum at Naval Air Station Pensacola, Florida. Veteran of the Pearl Harbor attack, the raid on Lae and Salamaua as part of VB-2, and the Battle of Midway as part of VMSB-241.
- 02173 – Pearl Harbor Aviation Museum at Ford Island, Hawaii.

SBD-3

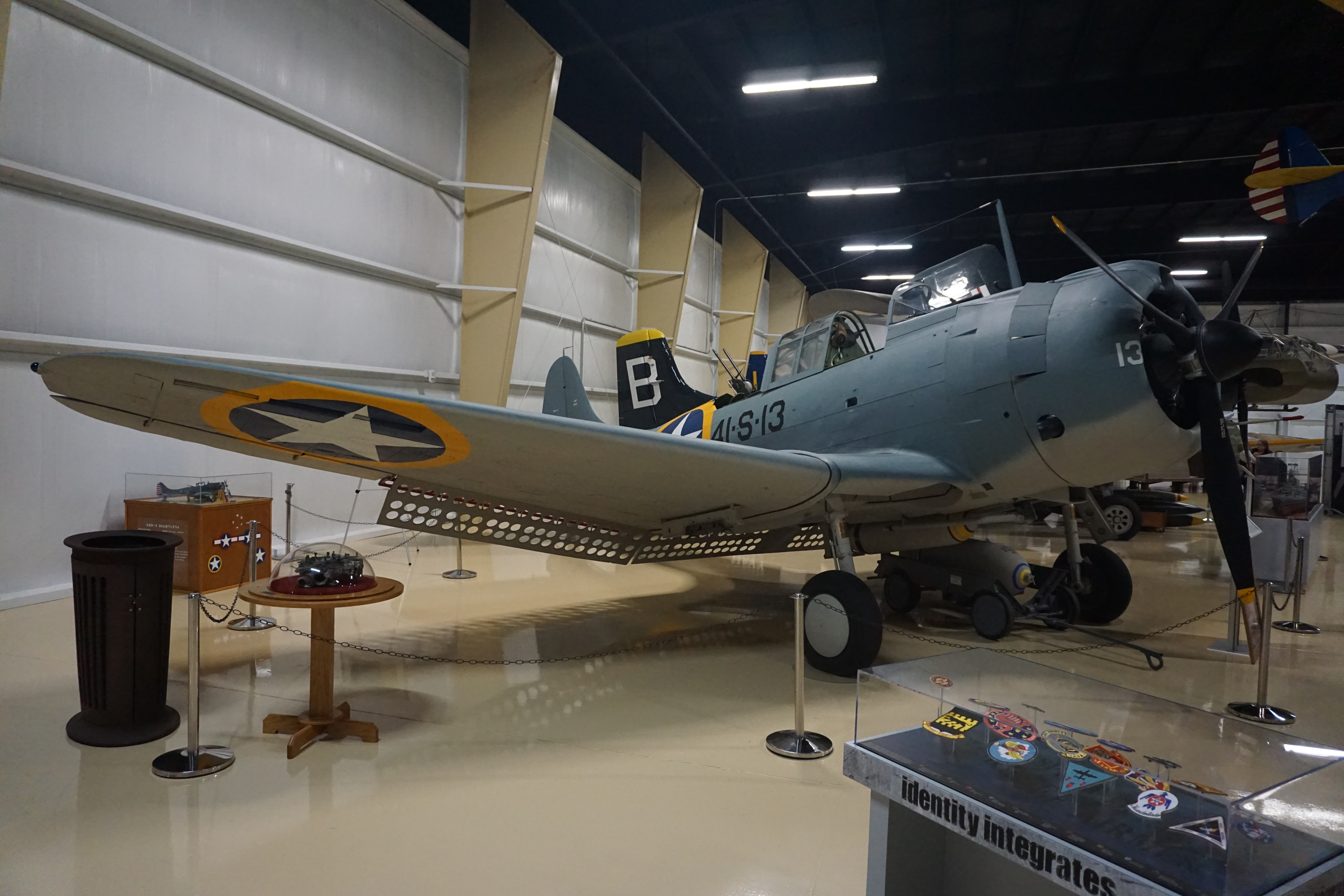
SBD-3 on display at the Air Zoo

- 06508 – National World War II Museum in New Orleans, Louisiana.
- 06583 – National Museum of the Marine Corps at Marine Corps Base Quantico, Virginia.
- 06624 – Air Zoo in Kalamazoo, Michigan. It is on loan from National Naval Aviation Museum at Naval Air Station Pensacola.
- 06694 – USS Lexington (CV-16) museum in Corpus Christi, Texas. It is on loan from National Naval Aviation Museum at Naval Air Station Pensacola.

SBD-4

- 06833 – National Naval Aviation Museum at Naval Air Station Pensacola, Florida in its recovered condition in a simulated underwater exhibit.
- 06900 – San Diego Aerospace Museum in San Diego, California. It is on loan from the National Naval Aviation Museum at Naval Air Station Pensacola.
- 10508 – USS Hornet Sea, Air & Space Museum in Alameda, California.
- 10575 – Battle of Midway Memorial at Midway Airport in Chicago, Illinois.

SBD-5

- 36173 – USS Yorktown (CV-10) at the Patriot's Point Naval and Maritime Museum in Mount Pleasant, South Carolina.
- 36176 – Palm Springs Air Museum in Palm Springs, California.
- 36291 – Valiant Air Command Warbird Museum in Titusville, Florida. It is on loan from the National Naval Aviation Museum at Naval Air Station Pensacola.
- 36711 – American Heritage Museum in Hudson, Massachusetts. Long-term loan from the National Naval Aviation Museum at Naval Air Station Pensacola. Formerly on display at Pearl Harbor Aviation Museum at Ford Island, Hawaii.

SBD-6

- 54605 – National Air and Space Museum in Washington, D.C.
- 54654 – USS Midway Museum in San Diego, California.

Under restoration or in storage

SBD-1

- 1612 – for display at the Air Zoo in Portage, Michigan.

SBD-4

- 10508 – for display at the Castle Air Museum at the former Castle Air Force Base in Atwater, California.

SBD-5

- 36175 – to flightworthiness at the Military Aviation Museum in Virginia Beach, Virginia.

== Specifications (SBD-5) ==
3-view of an SBD

Data from McDonnell Douglas aircraft since 1920 : Volume I

General characteristics

- Crew: 2
- Length: 33 ft 1.25 in (10.0902 m)
- Wingspan: 41 ft 6.375 in (12.65873 m)
- Height: 13 ft 7 in (4.14 m)
- Wing area: 325 sq ft (30.2 m^{2})
- Airfoil: root: NACA 2415; tip: NACA 2407
- Empty weight: 6,404 lb (2,905 kg)
- Gross weight: 9,359 lb (4,245 kg)
- Max takeoff weight: 10,700 lb (4,853 kg)
- Fuel capacity: 260 US gal (220 imp gal; 980 L) in non-metallic self-sealing fuel tanks
- Powerplant: 1 × Wright R-1820-60 Cyclone 9-cylinder air-cooled radial piston engine, 1,200 hp (890 kW)
- Propellers: 3-bladed Hamilton-Standard constant-speed propeller

Performance

- Maximum speed: 255 mph (410 km/h, 222 kn) at 14,000 ft (4,300 m)
- Cruise speed: 185 mph (298 km/h, 161 kn)
- Range: 1,115 mi (1,794 km, 969 nmi)
- Ferry range: 1,565 mi (2,519 km, 1,360 nmi)
- Service ceiling: 25,530 ft (7,780 m)
- Rate of climb: 1,700 ft/min (8.6 m/s)
- Wing loading: 28.8 lb/sq ft (141 kg/m^{2})
- Power/mass: 0.128 hp/lb (0.210 kW/kg)

Armament

- Guns: ** 2 × 0.50 in (12.7 mm) forward-firing synchronized Browning M2 machine guns in engine cowling
  - 2 × 0.30 in (7.62 mm) flexible-mounted Browning M1919 machine guns in rear
- Bombs: 2,250 lb (1,020 kg) of bombs

== See also ==
Related development

- Northrop YA-13
- Northrop A-17
- Northrop BT

Aircraft of comparable role, configuration, and era

- Aichi D3A "Val"
- Blackburn Skua
- Breda Ba.65
- Brewster SB2A Buccaneer
- Curtiss SB2C Helldiver
- Fairey Barracuda
- Junkers Ju 87 Stuka
- Saab 17
- Vought SB2U Vindicator
- Vultee A-31 Vengeance

Related lists

- List of aircraft of World War II
- List of United States Navy aircraft designations (pre-1962)
- List of military aircraft of the United States
- List of attack aircraft
