= Theo de Lange (RNZAF officer) =

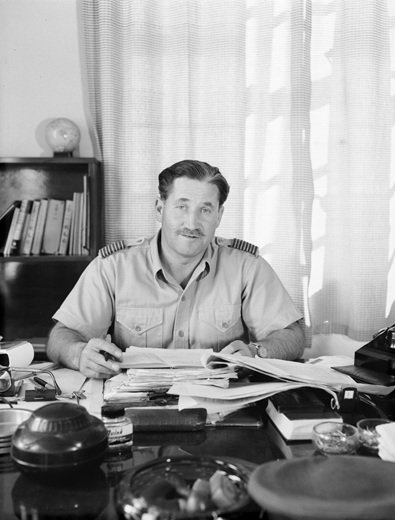
- Born: 16 June 1914; Simla, British India
- Died: 4 July 2005 (aged 91); Rotorua, New Zealand
- Military career
- Allegiance: New Zealand
- Branch: Royal New Zealand Air Force
- Rank: Air Commodore
- Commands: No. 25 Squadron; No. 41 Squadron
- Conflicts: Second World War: Solomon Islands campaign; Cold War
- Awards: Commander of the Order of the British Empire; Distinguished Flying Cross

Air Commodore Theodore Jasper Maclean de Lange CBE, DFC (16 June 1914 – 4 July 2005) was a senior officer in the Royal New Zealand Air Force (RNZAF) in the Second World War and the postwar period.

== Biography ==
Born in Simla in British India on 16 June 1914, de Lange joined the RNZAF on 4 January 1938. During the Second World War, he served in the Solomon Islands campaign as the commander of No. 25 Squadron. He was awarded the Distinguished Flying Cross (DFC) in 1944 "in recognition of gallantry and devotion to duty in the execution of air operations in the South-West Pacific area". He subsequently served in India as a liaison officer for the RNZAF and from June 1947 to March 1949 was commander of No. 41 Squadron. In 1953, he was awarded the Queen Elizabeth II Coronation Medal.

From 1961 to 1965, de Lange served on the Air Board as the member for personnel. In the 1965 Queen's Birthday Honours, de Lange was awarded the Commander of the Order of the British Empire (CBE), for his many years of distinguished service in the RNZAF.

Retired from the RNZAF on 9 February 1966 with the rank of air commodore, de Lange died in Rotorua on 4 July 2005, aged 91.
