= Wilbur J. Thomas =

American military aviator (1920–1947)

Wilbur Jackson Thomas
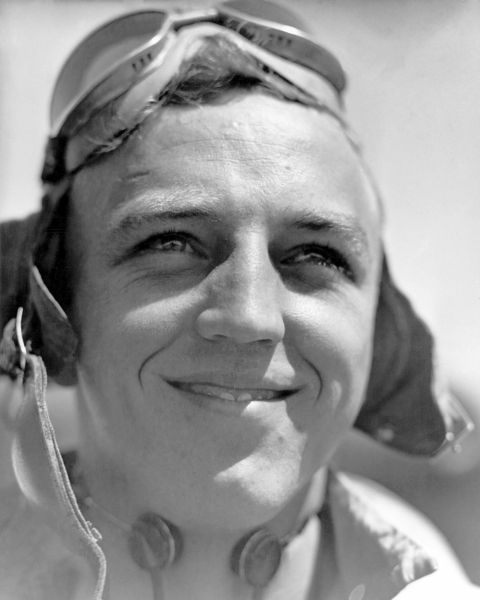
- Born: October 29, 1920; El Dorado, Kansas, US
- Died: January 28, 1947 (aged 26); Orange County, California, US
- Burial place: Forest Lawn Memorial Park (Glendale)
- Military career
- Branch: United States Marine Corps
- Service years: 1942-1947
- Rank: Captain
- Nickname: "Jack"
- Service number: 0-13630
- Unit: VMF-213
- Conflicts: World War II * Philippines Campaign (1944–45) * Battle of Iwo Jima * Battle of Okinawa
- Awards: Navy Cross; Distinguished Flying Cross

Wilbur Jackson Thomas (October 29, 1920 – January 28, 1947) was an American combat pilot who was a United States Marine Corps fighter ace during World War II. He flew a Vought F4U Corsair in Marine Fighting Squadron 213 (VMF-213) which was assigned to the aircraft carrier USS Essex (CV-9) and was one of the first Marine squadrons to augment carrier air groups. Thomas was a triple ace with 18.5 aerial victories. He was killed in January 1947 attempting to land a Grumman F7F Tigercat at the Marine Corps Air Station El Toro in California.

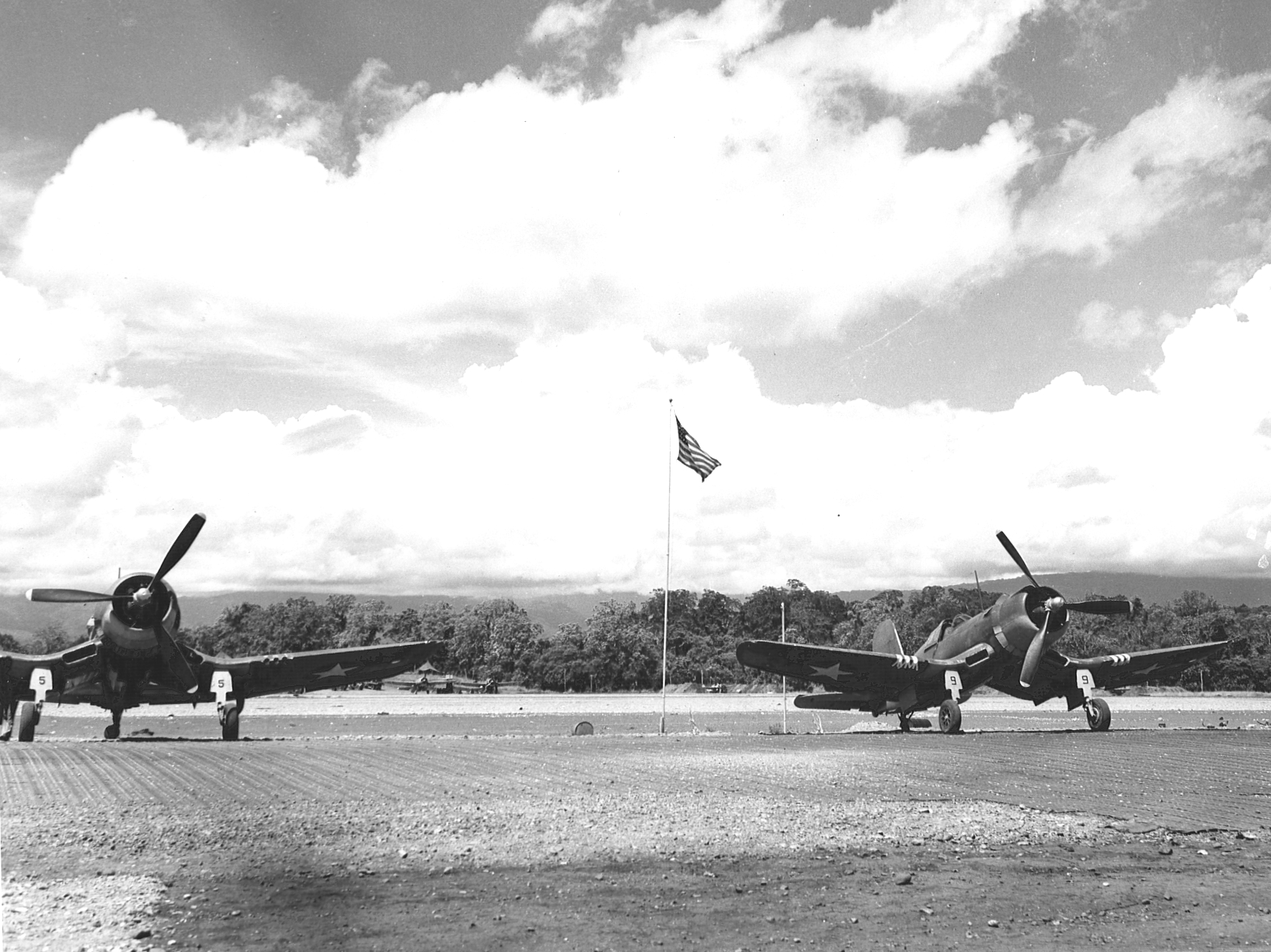
U.S. Marine Corps Vought F4U Corsair aircraft of Marine Fighting Squadron 213 (VMF-213) at Henderson Field, Guadalcanal, June 1943

== See also ==
- James N. Cupp
