= VMFA-124 =

Marine Fighter Attack Squadron 124
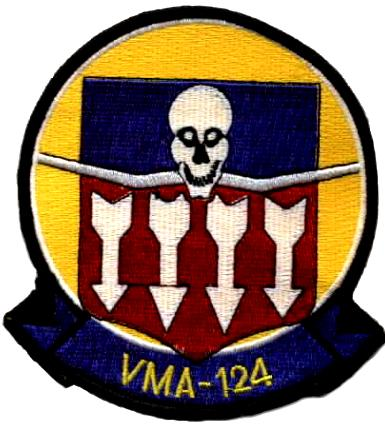
- VMA-124 Insignia
- Active: 2 September 1942 - 1996
- Country: United States of America
- Branch: United States Marine Corps
- Type: Fighter/Attack squadron
- Role: Air interdiction
- Nicknames: Whistling Death; Wild Aces; Checkerboards
- Tail Code: QP
- Engagements: World War II; Battle of Guadalcanal; Solomon Islands Campaign; Philippines Campaign, 1944-45; Battle of Iwo Jima; Battle of Okinawa

Aircraft flown
- Attack: A-4 Skyhawk
- Fighter: F4U Corsair; F9F Cougar; FJ-4B Fury

Marine Fighter Attack Squadron 124 (VMFA-124) was a flying squadron in the Marine Forces Reserve based out of Naval Air Station Memphis flying the Douglas A-4 Skyhawk. They were part of Marine Aircraft Group 42 and were decommissioned on 19 June 1999.

The squadron was formed as VMF-124 in 1942 and was the first Marine squadron to fly the Vought F4U Corsair during World War II and also one of the first Marine squadrons to be based on an aircraft carrier. They were known as the "Wild Aces" and ended World War II with 78 air-to-air victories against Japanese aircraft.

The squadron was redesignated as Marine Attack Squadron 124 (VMA-124) in 1965 and to (VMFA-124 in 1994.

== History ==
=== World War II ===
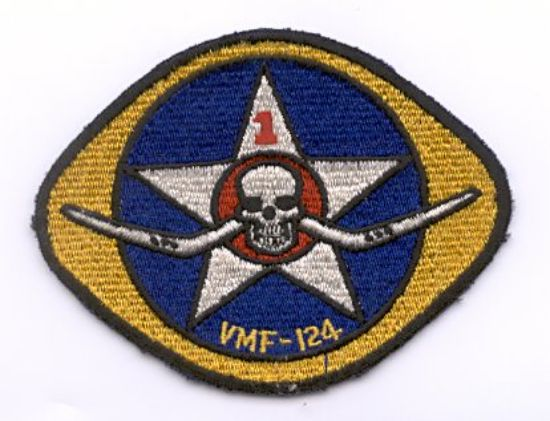
Squadron logo from World War II

VMF-124 was commissioned on 2 September 1942 at Camp Kearney, San Diego, California. The squadron was declared fully operational on 28 December 1942 even though the squadron’s pilots had only an average of 25 hours each in the plane. -124 arrived on Guadalcanal on the morning of 12 February 1943 led by their commanding officer, Major William Gise. The squadron flew its first mission before lunch that day, with twelve F4Us escorting a PBY Catalina on a 230 mile mission to pick up two downed pilots at Sandfly Bay, Vella Lavella.

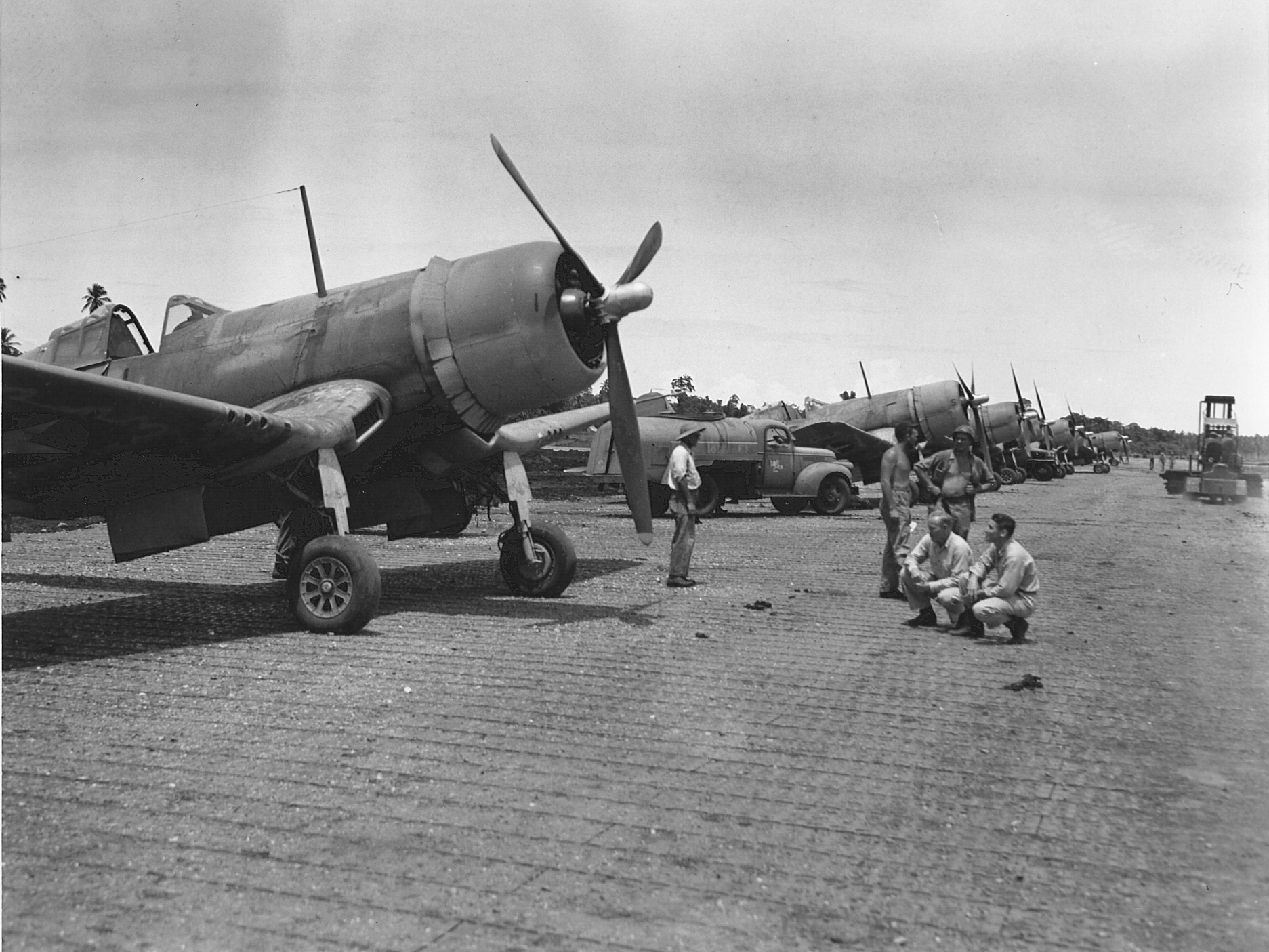
VMF-124 Corsairs on Guadalcanal.

The first F4U pilot to be decorated with the Medal of Honor came from VMF-124 — 1st Lt Kenneth A. Walsh for a mission on 30 August 1943, during which he shot down four Japanese Zeros before ditching his borrowed Corsair. The squadron remained in the Solomon Islands until September 1943, fighting over the Russell Islands, New Georgia and Vella Levella.

Following the fighting in the Solomons, the squadron was disbanded and reconstituted back in the United States where it trained in the Mojave Desert at Marine Corps Auxiliary Airfield Mojave for the next year. When they received their orders for carrier assignments they had five combat experienced pilots as their training nucleus VMF-124 left the States again on 18 September 1944, heading to Hawaii. While in Hawaii they were attached to Navy Air Group 4 who were operating off the USS Essex (CV-9). Along with VMF-213, 124 became the first Marine squadron to be based on an aircraft carrier. While deployed aboard the Essex, they took part in fighting over Lingayen, Luzon, Formosa, Tokyo, Iwo Jima and Okinawa. On 3 January 1945 VMF-124 and VMF-213 struck Formosa and the Ryukyu Islands in the first Marine land strike off a carrier. On 12 January 1945 three planes from VMF-124 were involved in a friendly fire incident when they shot down a four-engine bomber over French Indochina that had refused to identify itself and had fired on the planes; the aircraft later was identified as a B-24 Liberator (serial number 42-73429) of the United States Army Air Forces 374th Bombardment Squadron.

=== Reserve activity ===
The squadron was reformed shortly after the war at Naval Air Station Memphis and were equipped with the F4U-4 Corsair. They were the first squadron in the newly formed Marine Air Reserve Training Command to reach full strength. The squadron was redesignated Marine Attack Squadron 124 (VMA-124) on 1 May 1965 and were subsequently equipped with the A-4 Skyhawk. In 1969, for its two week annual training period, the squadron's fourteen A-4Bs supported the Reserve Marine Expeditionary Brigade Landing Exercise. At the time, the exercise was the largest Marine air/ground maneuver exercise ever held in the continental United States.

During the 1970s and 1980s they flew various versions of the A-4 until 1994 when the squadron was moved to Naval Air Station Joint Reserve Base Fort Worth and re-designated Marine Fighter Attack Squadron 124 (VMFA-124). The unit existed as a paper squadron only for two years while awaiting McDonnell Douglas F/A-18 Hornets that would never materialize. The squadron was ultimately deactivated on 19 June 1999.

== Squadron aces ==
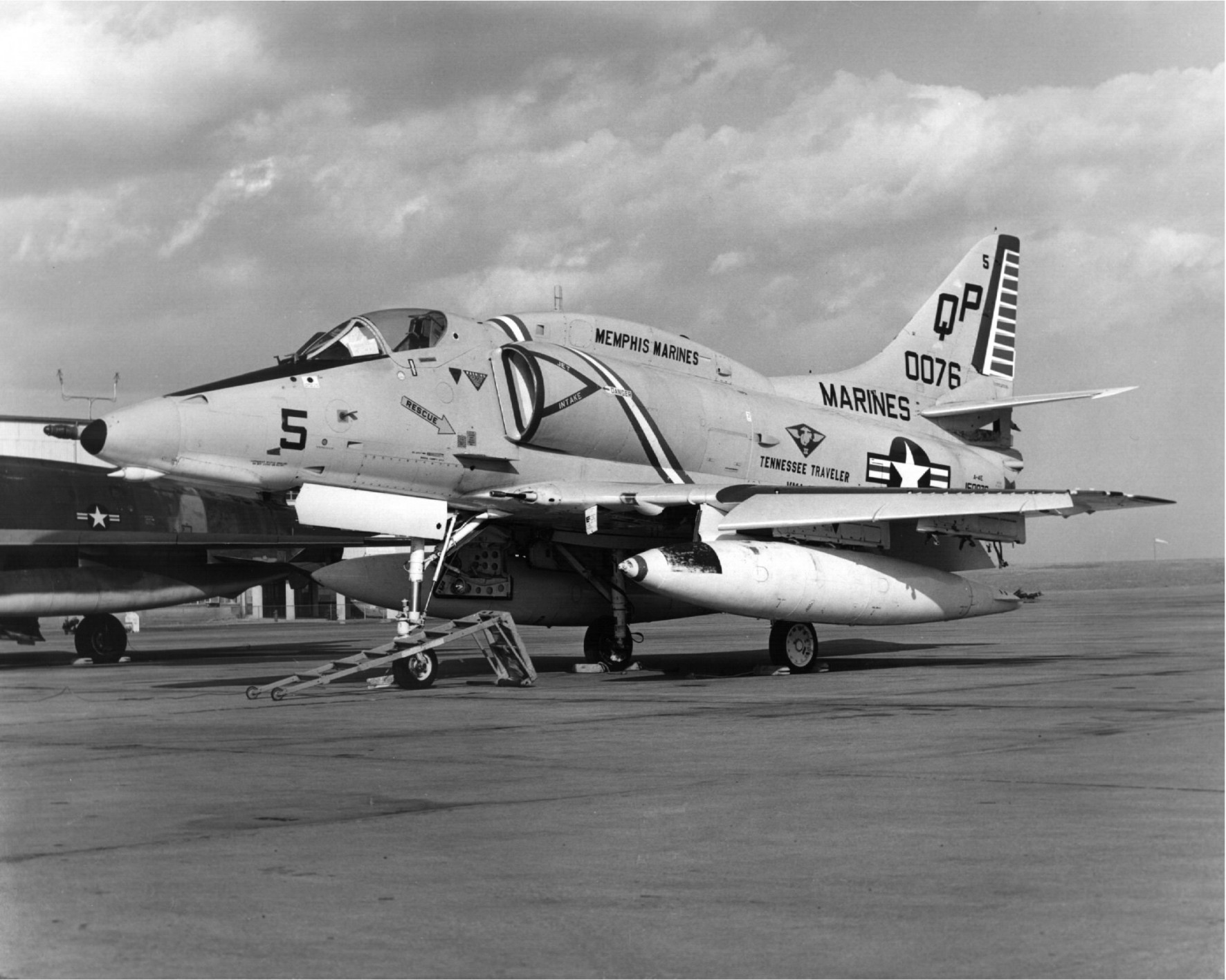
An A-4E of VMA-124

The following members of VMF-124 were credited with at least 5 enemy aircraft shot down during World War II:

- William E. Crowe
- Howard J. Finn
- Wallace E. Sigler
- Kenneth A. Walsh

== See also ==
- United States Marine Corps Aviation
- List of active United States Marine Corps aircraft squadrons
- List of decommissioned United States Marine Corps aircraft squadrons
