= Kenneth A. Walsh =

United States Marine Corps Medal of Honor recipient and World War II flying ace

Kenneth Ambrose Walsh
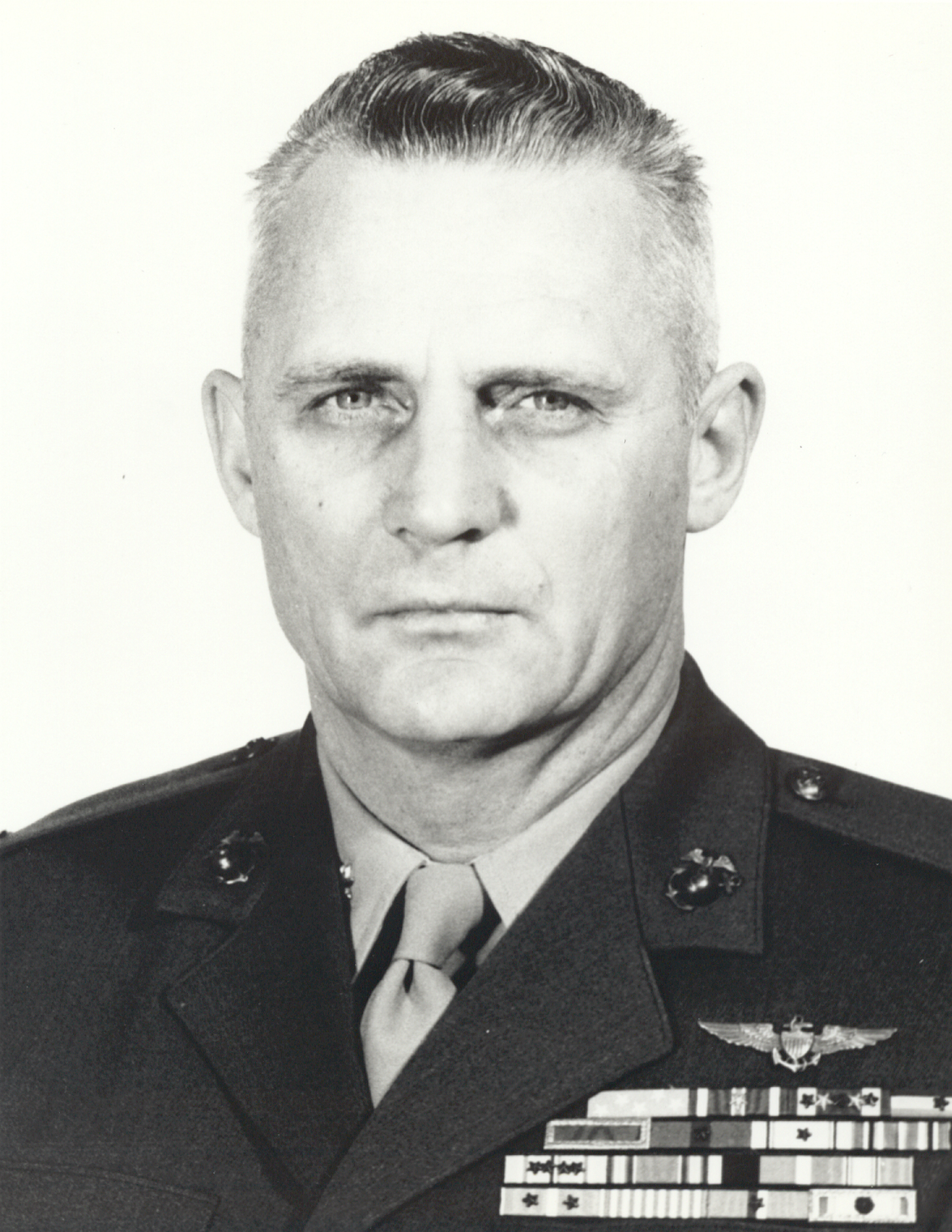
- Lieutenant Colonel Kenneth A. Walsh, U.S. Marine Corps
- Born: November 24, 1916; Brooklyn, New York, US
- Died: July 30, 1998 (aged 81); Santa Ana, California, US
- Burial place: Arlington National Cemetery
- Military career
- Allegiance: United States of America
- Branch: United States Marine Corps
- Service years: 1933–1962
- Rank: Lieutenant Colonel
- Unit: VMF-124
- Conflicts: World War II: Pacific Theater; Korean War
- Awards: Medal of Honor; Distinguished Flying Cross (7); Air Medal (15)

Kenneth Ambrose Walsh (November 24, 1916 – July 30, 1998) was a United States Marine Corps lieutenant colonel and a Medal of Honor recipient who was the fourth-ranking USMC fighter ace in World War II with a record of 21 enemy planes destroyed. He also served in Korea during the first year of the Korean War and retired from the Marine Corps in February 1962.

== Early life ==
Walsh was born in Brooklyn, New York. He graduated from Dickinson High School in Jersey City, New Jersey, in 1933.

== Military career ==
Walsh enlisted in the Marine Corps on 15 December 1933, at age 17. Following recruit training at Marine Corps Recruit Depot Parris Island, South Carolina, he became an aircraft mechanic and radioman at Marine Corps Base Quantico, Virginia. In March 1936, he was transferred, and entered flight training at NAS in Pensacola, Florida. He was still a private when he received his Wings of Gold as a U.S. Naval Aviator on 26 April 1937, but was promoted to corporal soon thereafter. He flew scout-observation aircraft over the next four years on three aircraft carriers, before assignment to VMF-121 in North Carolina.

At the time of the attack on Pearl Harbor, he was a master technical sergeant, becoming a Marine Gunner (equivalent to warrant officer) on 11 May 1942, while serving with Marine Aircraft Group 12, 1st Marine Aircraft Wing. He was commissioned a second lieutenant the following October and was promoted to first lieutenant in June 1943. He was also one of a handful of Marine aviators qualified as an aircraft carrier landing signal officer. Assigned to VMF-124 since September 1942, Walsh was one of the most experienced pilots in the Corps' first Vought F4U Corsair squadron. The unit had arrived at Guadalcanal in February 1943, and was immediately committed to combat. He claimed his first three Japanese planes on 1 April 1943 and two more in his next combat action, 13 May 1943, becoming the first Corsair fighter ace. Walsh brought his score to 20 victories by the end of August 1943, including two combat actions over the Solomon Islands which earned him the Medal of Honor. He returned to the United States on 15 October 1943.

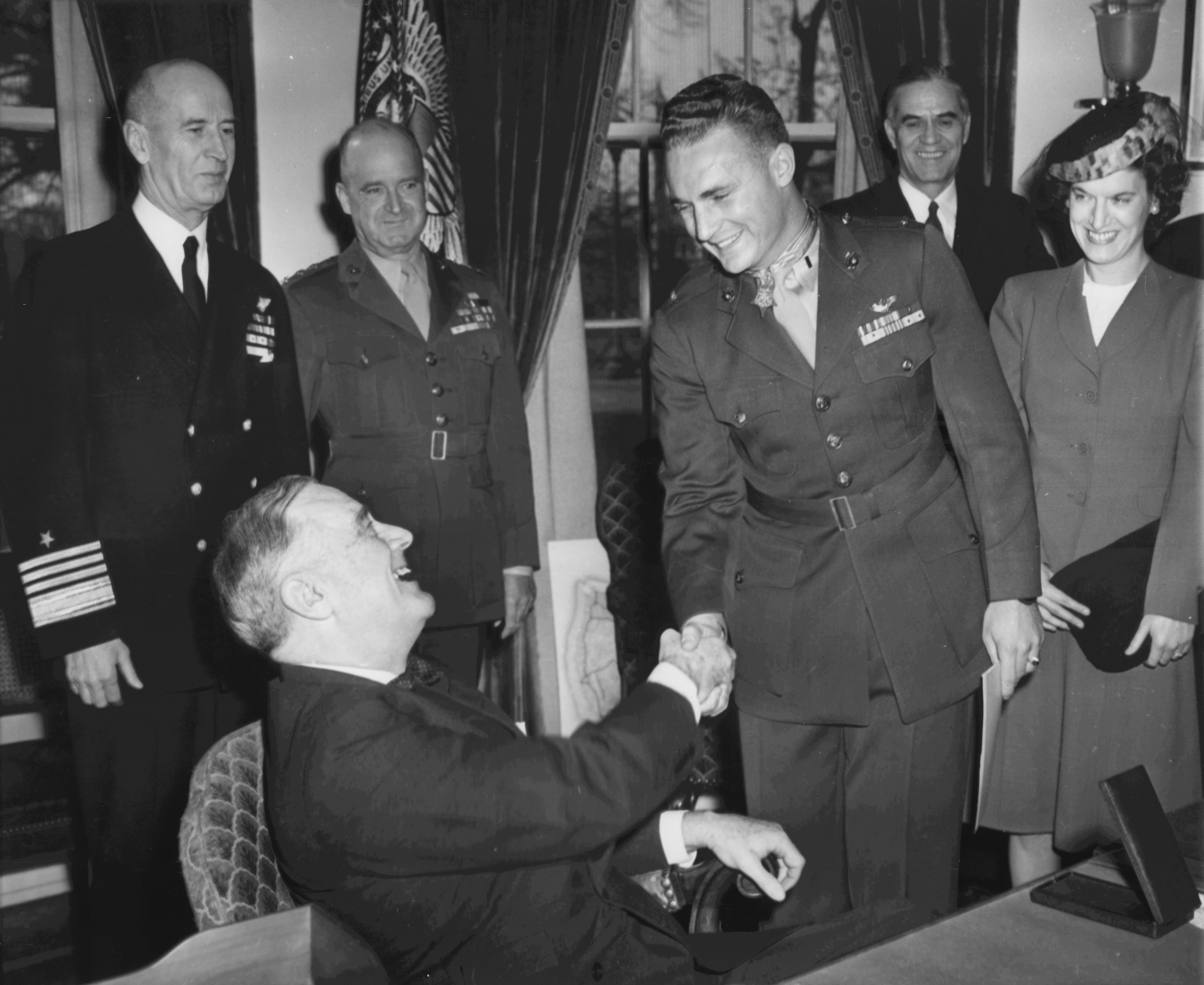
U.S. President Franklin D. Roosevelt shakes hands with Walsh while Admiral Ernest King, Lieutenant General Alexander Vandegrift, Assistant Secretary of the Navy Ralph A. Bard, and Mrs. Beulah Walsh look on.

President Franklin D. Roosevelt presented Walsh the Medal of Honor on 8 February 1944; he was promoted to temporary captain effective 8 February when he received the award and was promoted to permanent captain on 13 November 1948.

Walsh returned to flying combat missions in April 1945, serving with VMF-122, and was awarded his 7th Distinguished Flying Cross for heroism and extraordinary achievement from 28 April to 12 May 1945, in the Philippine Islands area. He scored his last kill while serving as the Operations Officer of VMF-222 at Okinawa on 22 June 1945. He became the Assistant Operations Officer of Marine Aircraft Group 14, 2nd Marine Aircraft Wing on Okinawa. He returned to the United States in March 1946.

Walsh served in Korea during the Korean War with VMR-152 (Marine Transport Squadron 152), flying C-54 transports, from 15 July 1950 to late July 1951. He was promoted to major in April 1955 and lieutenant colonel in October 1958.

== Retirement and later life ==
In 1955 Walsh moved his family to the West Floral Park neighborhood of Santa Ana. Walsh retired from the Marine Corps as a lieutenant colonel on 1 February 1962. He was a frequent participant in history seminars and often assisted researchers and historians interested in the Pacific War.

Walsh died at age 81 due to a heart attack. He left a widow, Beulah, and a son, and was buried at Arlington National Cemetery on 13 August 1998.

== Military awards ==
Walsh's military decorations and awards include:

Naval Aviator Badge
Medal of Honor		Distinguished Flying Cross w/ one 5/16" Silver Star and one 5/16" Gold Star
Air Medal w/ two 5/16" Silver Stars and two 5/16" Gold Stars	Air Medal w/ 5/16" Gold Star (second ribbon required for accouterment spacing)	Combat Action Ribbon w/ 5/16" Gold Star
Navy Presidential Unit Citation w/ 3/16" Bronze Star	Air Force Presidential Unit Citation	Marine Corps Good Conduct Medal w/ 3/16" Bronze Star
American Defense Service Medal w/ 3/16" Bronze Star	American Campaign Medal	Asiatic-Pacific Campaign Medal w/ four 3/16" Bronze Stars
World War II Victory Medal	Navy Occupation Service Medal w/ 'Asia' clasp	National Defense Service Medal w/ 3/16" Bronze Star
Korean Service Medal w/ three 3/16" Bronze Stars	Philippine Presidential Unit Citation	Republic of Korea Presidential Unit Citation
Philippine Liberation Medal w/ 3/16" Bronze Star	United Nations Service Medal for Korea	Korean War Service Medal

=== Medal of Honor citation ===
Rank and organization: First Lieutenant, pilot in Marine Fighting Squadron 124, U.S. Marine Corps.
Place and date: Solomon Islands area, 15 and 30 August 1943.
Entered service at: New York.
Born: 24 November 1916, Brooklyn, N.Y.
Other Navy awards: Distinguished Flying Cross with 5 Gold Stars

Citation:

For extraordinary heroism and intrepidity above and beyond the call of duty as a pilot in Marine Fighting Squadron 124 in aerial combat against enemy Japanese forces in the Solomon Islands area. Determined to thwart the enemy's attempt to bomb Allied ground forces and shipping at Vella Lavella on 15 August 1943, 1st Lt. Walsh repeatedly dived his plane into an enemy formation outnumbering his own division 6 to 1 and, although his plane was hit numerous times, shot down 2 Japanese dive bombers and 1 fighter. After developing engine trouble on 30 August during a vital escort mission, 1st Lt. Walsh landed his mechanically disabled plane at Munda, quickly replaced it with another, and proceeded to rejoin his flight over Kahili. Separated from his escort group when he encountered approximately 50 Japanese Zeros, he unhesitatingly attacked, striking with relentless fury in his lone battle against a powerful force. He destroyed 4 hostile fighters before cannon shellfire forced him to make a dead-stick landing off Vella Lavella where he was later picked up. His valiant leadership and his daring skill as a flier served as a source of confidence and inspiration to his fellow pilots and reflect the highest credit upon the U.S. Naval Service.

== See also ==
- List of Medal of Honor recipients for World War II
