= VMF-222 =

Marine Fighting Squadron 222
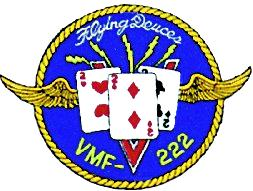
- VMF-222’s Insignia
- Active: 1 March 1942 – 31 December 1949
- Country: United States
- Allegiance: United States of America
- Branch: United States Marine Corps
- Type: Fighter squadron
- Role: Air interdiction Close air support
- Part of: Inactive
- Nicknames: "Flying Deuces" "SeaBee Air Force"
- Engagements: World War II * Solomons Islands Campaign * Philippines campaign (1944–45) * Battle of Okinawa

Aircraft flown
- Fighter: SNJ Texan; F4U-4 Corsair

Marine Fighting Squadron 222 (VMF-222) was a fighter squadron of the United States Marine Corps that was activated and fought during World War II. Known as "The Flying Deuces," they fell under the command of Marine Aircraft Group 14 (MAG-14) and fought in many areas of the Pacific War, including the Philippines campaign (1944–45) and the Battle of Okinawa. During the war, the squadron was credited with shooting down 53 enemy aircraft and was the sister squadron to VMF-215. They were deactivated on 31 December 1949.

== History ==
VMF-222 was commissioned on 1 March 1942, at Midway Atoll. They were originally formed from members of VMF-221 and were part of Marine Aircraft Group 22. The squadron was transferred to Marine Corps Air Station Ewa, Hawaii, in April 1942 and remained until September 1942 when they returned to the United States. They then were sent to the Solomon Islands, operating from bases on Munda and Bougainville.

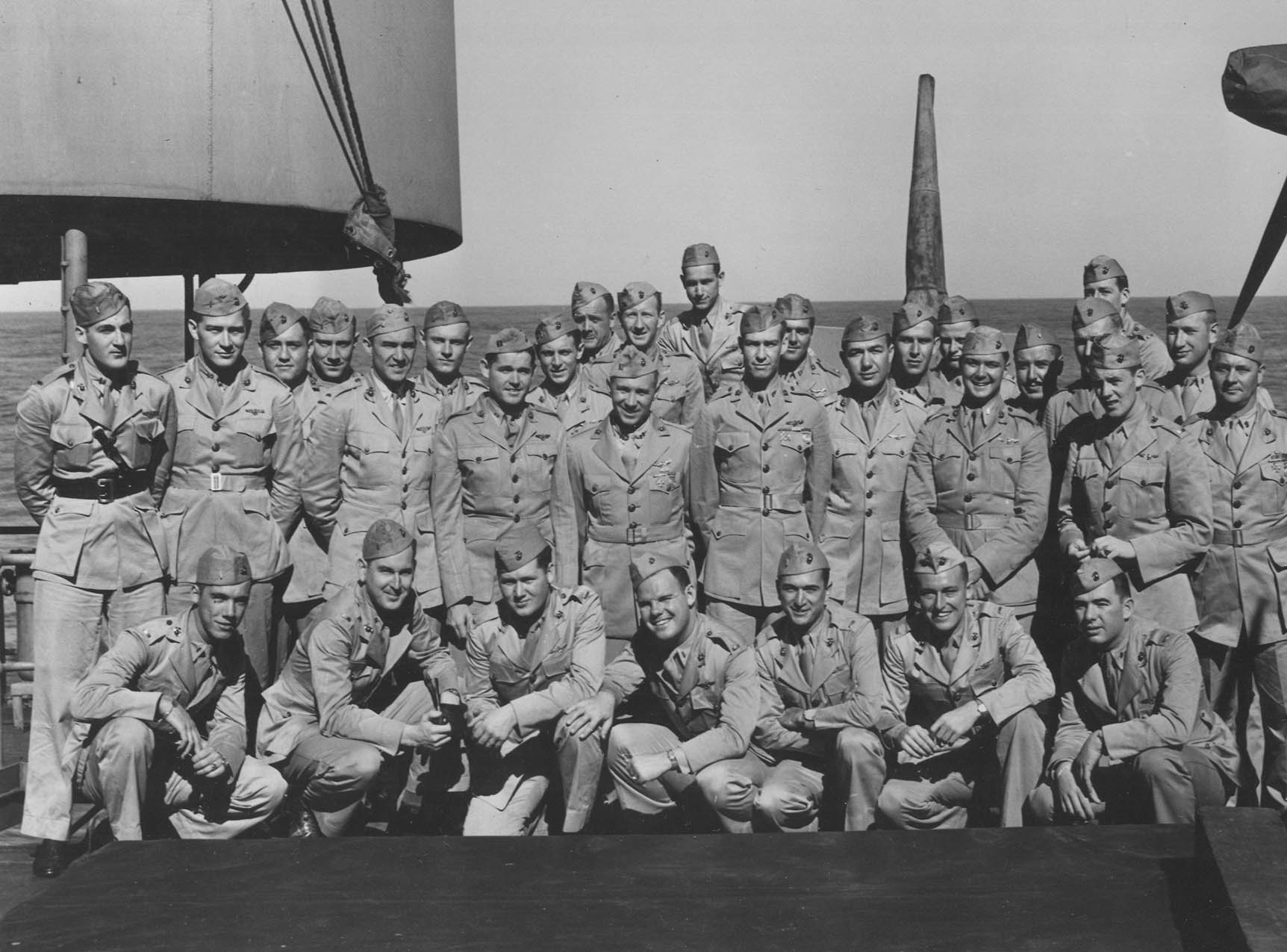
Pilots of VMF-222 aboard AV-9 Pocomoke during the voyage between San Diego and Pearl Harbor, February 1943. US Navy Photo 80-G-38594

Following the Battle of the Green Islands, on 13 March 1944, VMF-222 landed on the newly constructed airfield on Green Island along with VMF-223. From here they participated in the allied effort to isolate the Japanese bases on Rabaul and Kavieng. In May and June of that year Charles Lindbergh, while in the area as a civilian technician, flew combat sorties with the squadron.

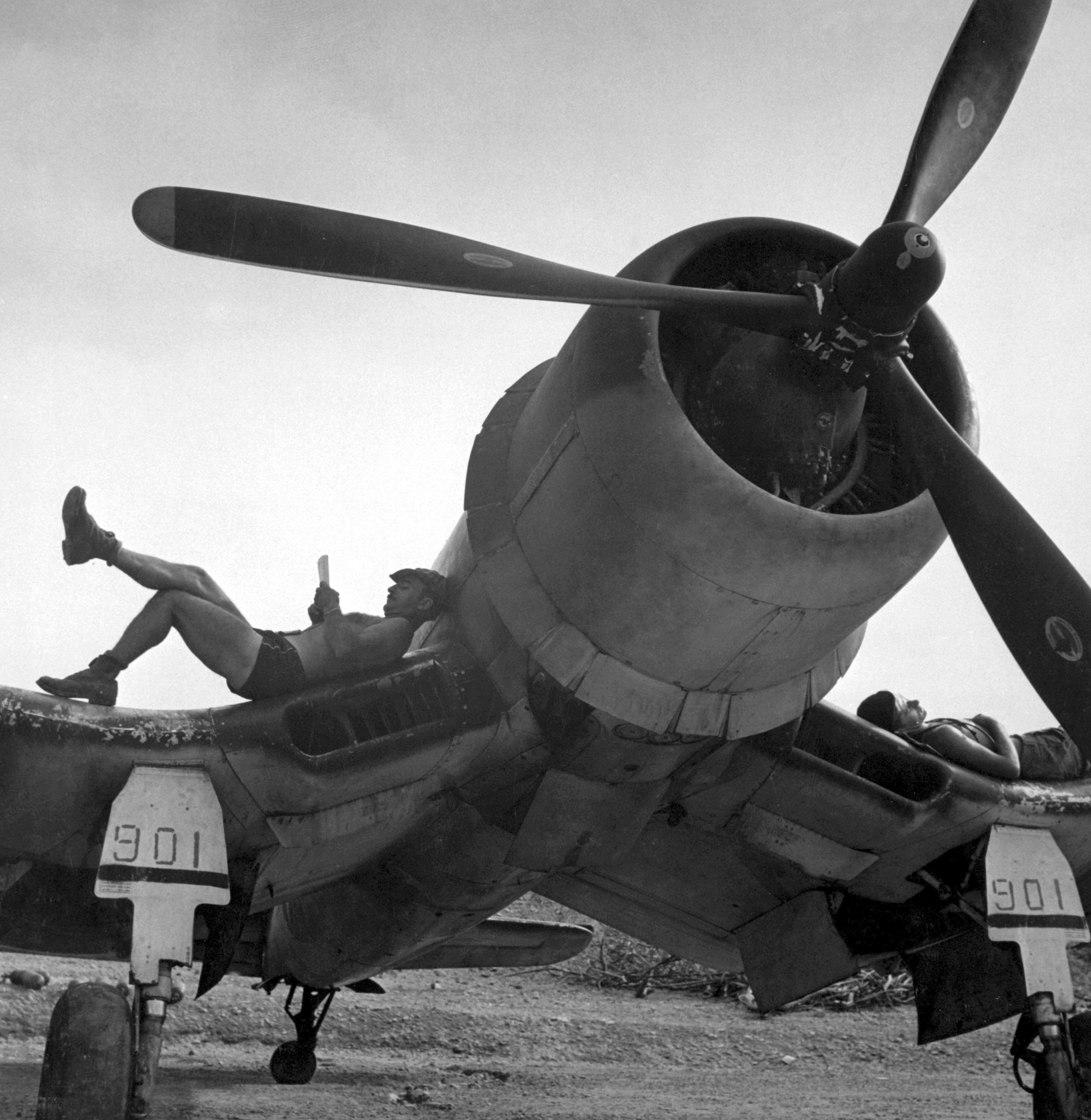
An F4U-1 of VMF-222 on Bougainville, April 1944.

On 11 January 1945, the squadron, along with other from MAG-14, landed on the island of Guinan in the Philippines.

Between April and June 1945, VMF-222 operated from Samar in the Philippines. These missions were in a fighter-bomber capacity.

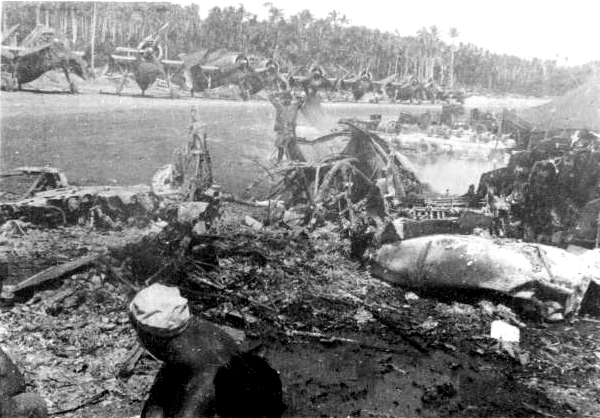
Remains of the Corsair that crashed at 0940 AM on 24 January 1945 piloted by 1stLt Karl Oerth

It was during this time that the squadron was a part of one of the worst aviation accidents of the war. At 0940 AM on 24 January 1945, while taking off, 1stLt Karl Oerth hit a lump in the runway, blew a tire, and his Corsair careened wildly into his own squadron's revetment area, which was shared with VMF-212. It completely wiped out the tents housing the intelligence, oxygen, parachutes, and materiel departments. Many men attempted to rescue the pilot but while they were making this brave effort the plane exploded and set off all its .50 cal ammunition. 14 men were killed and over 50 wounded during this incident.

By early May 1945 the need for air support in the central Philippines had decreased and VMF-222, was transferred to the 2nd Marine Aircraft Wing on the island of Okinawa.

Following the surrender of Japan the squadron was transferred to Marine Corps Air Station Miramar, California and placed in a cadre status while its gear was used to form the new VMF-912. They regained their flying status in January 1947 but were deactivated at Marine Corps Air Station Cherry Point, North Carolina, on 31 December 1949

== Notable former members ==
- Donald H. Stapp - recipient of the Navy Cross with 10 confirmed kills
- Kenneth Ambrose Walsh, USMC (retired), Congressional Medal of Honor recipient. Walsh served with VMF-222 during his second combat tour. He scored the last of his 21 victories whilst flying an F4U-4 Corsair with VMF-222.

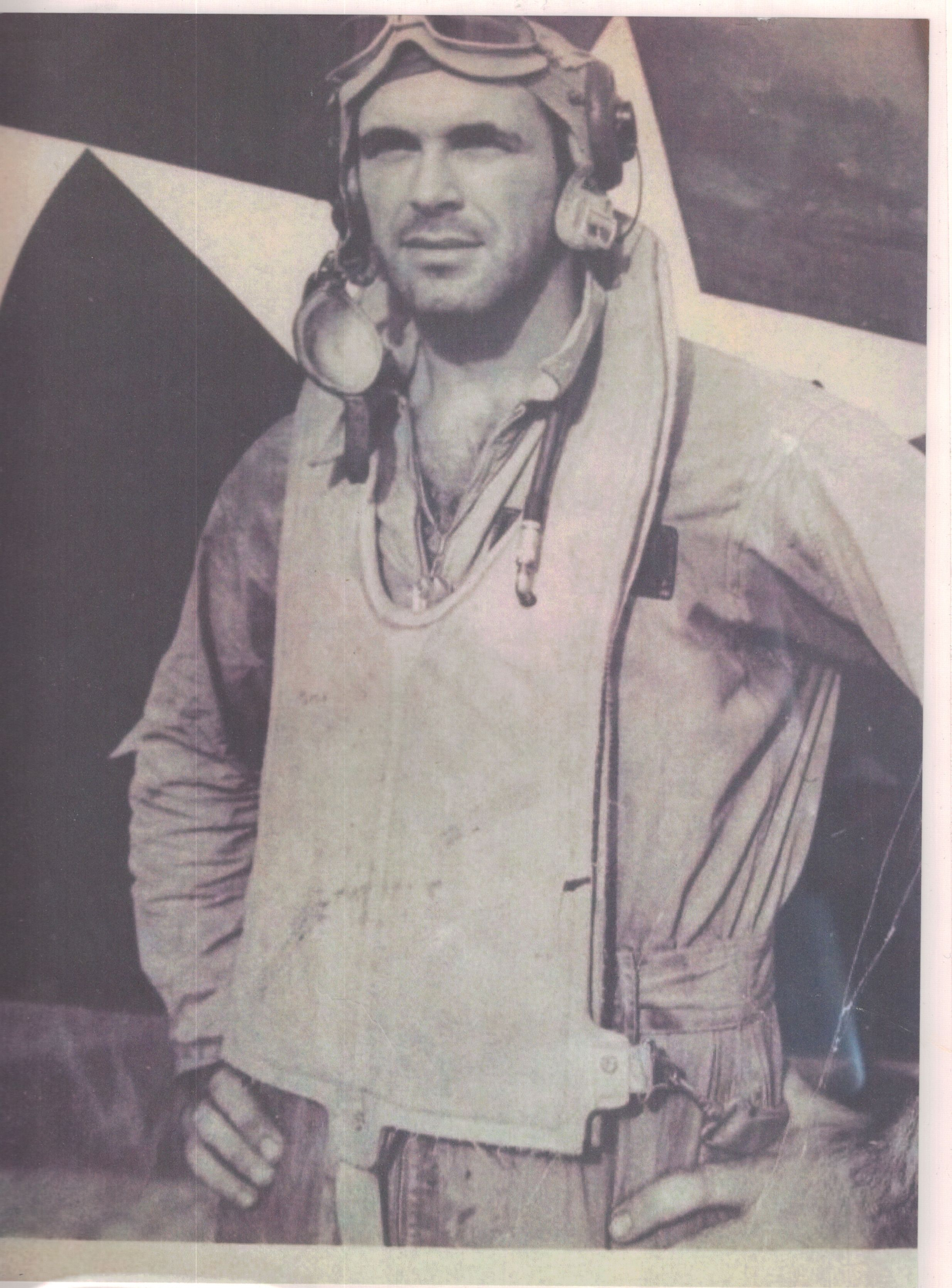
Captain Arthur Miller

- Captain Arthur Miller United States Marine Corps VMF 222, 111 Combat Missions, DFC x2. Click here for a detailed description of Captain Miller defending the USS Franklin from attack on 19 March 1945.

== Unit awards ==
A unit citation or commendation is an award bestowed upon an organization for the action cited. Members of the unit who participated in said actions are allowed to wear on their uniforms the awarded unit citation. VMF-222 was presented with the following awards:

Ribbon	Unit Award
	Presidential Unit Citation
	Asiatic-Pacific Campaign Medal
	World War II Victory Medal

== See also ==
- United States Marine Corps Aviation
- List of active United States Marine Corps aircraft squadrons
- List of decommissioned United States Marine Corps aircraft squadrons
