= Gun harmonisation =

Aiming of fixed guns on fighter aircraft wings

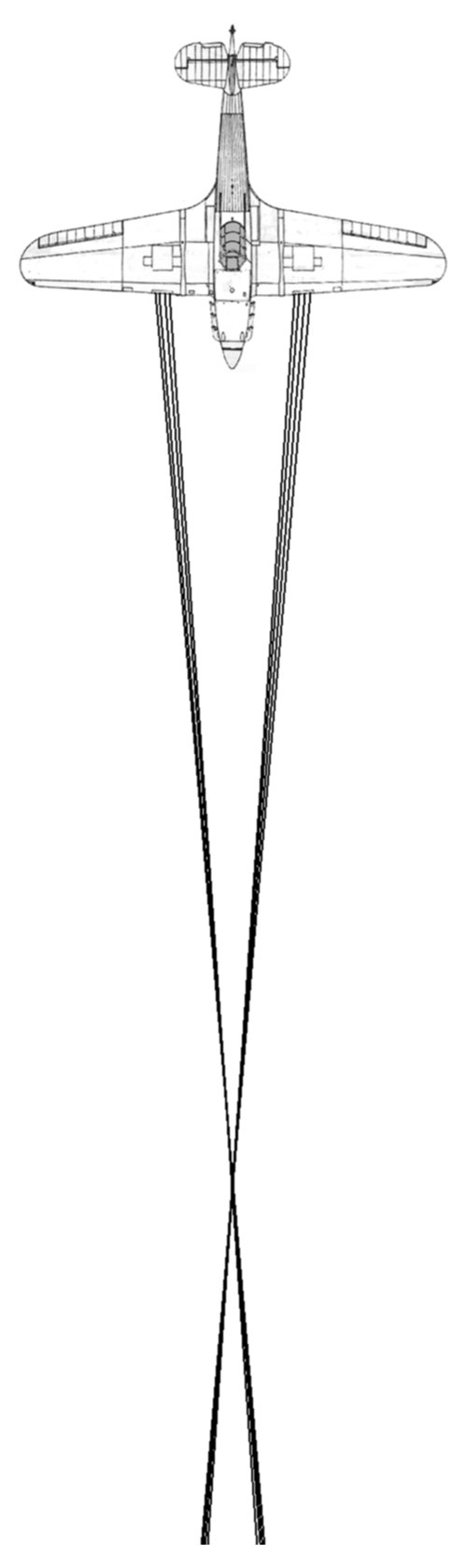
Fire from the eight machine guns of a Hawker Hurricane is shown converging to a point, then diverging. (Drawing not to scale.)

In aerial gunnery, gun harmonisation, convergence pattern, convergence zone, convergence point or bore-sight point refers to the aiming of fixed guns or cannon carried in the wings of a fighter aircraft.

The wing guns in fighters were typically not bore-sighted to point straight ahead; instead they were aimed slightly inward so that the projectiles met at one or more areas several hundred yards or metres in front of the fighter's nose. The intent was either to spread the fire of multiple weapons to increase the chance of a hit, called "pattern harmonisation", or to concentrate the fire to deliver greater damage at one point, called "point harmonisation".

A drawback of harmonisation was that guns worked effectively in a limited zone, so targets closer or farther away from the zone were not damaged as much, or were completely missed. The rounds would diverge further apart after passing through the convergence point.

The convergence of multiple guns was a common practice from the 1930s to the 1950s, especially in World War II. Military aircraft from the 1960s onward generally did not carry guns in the wings, so convergence was not as much of a concern.

== Background ==
As World War I came to a close, the standard pursuit (fighter) armament was two rifle-calibre machine guns mounted on the cowl of the fuselage, synchronised to fire between the propeller blades, a process which slowed the rate of fire. In the late 1920s and 1930s, electrically controlled firing mechanisms, (coupled with the advent of more reliable weapons systems that did not require a pilot close by to clear any malfunctions), allowed aircraft designers to place guns in the wings, negating the need for synchronisation. These wing guns could fire at their maximum rate; they were aimed slightly inward to give a converging field of fire at a certain range.

In the mid-1930s when the front-line fighters of many countries including Italy, Japan, and the US were still using only two synchronised guns on the fuselage, the UK ordered their fighters to carry eight guns, four in each wing. This made the Supermarine Spitfire and the Hawker Hurricane the most heavily armed fighters in the world at the time, but there arose a lively debate about how these guns should be converged.

== Size of pattern ==
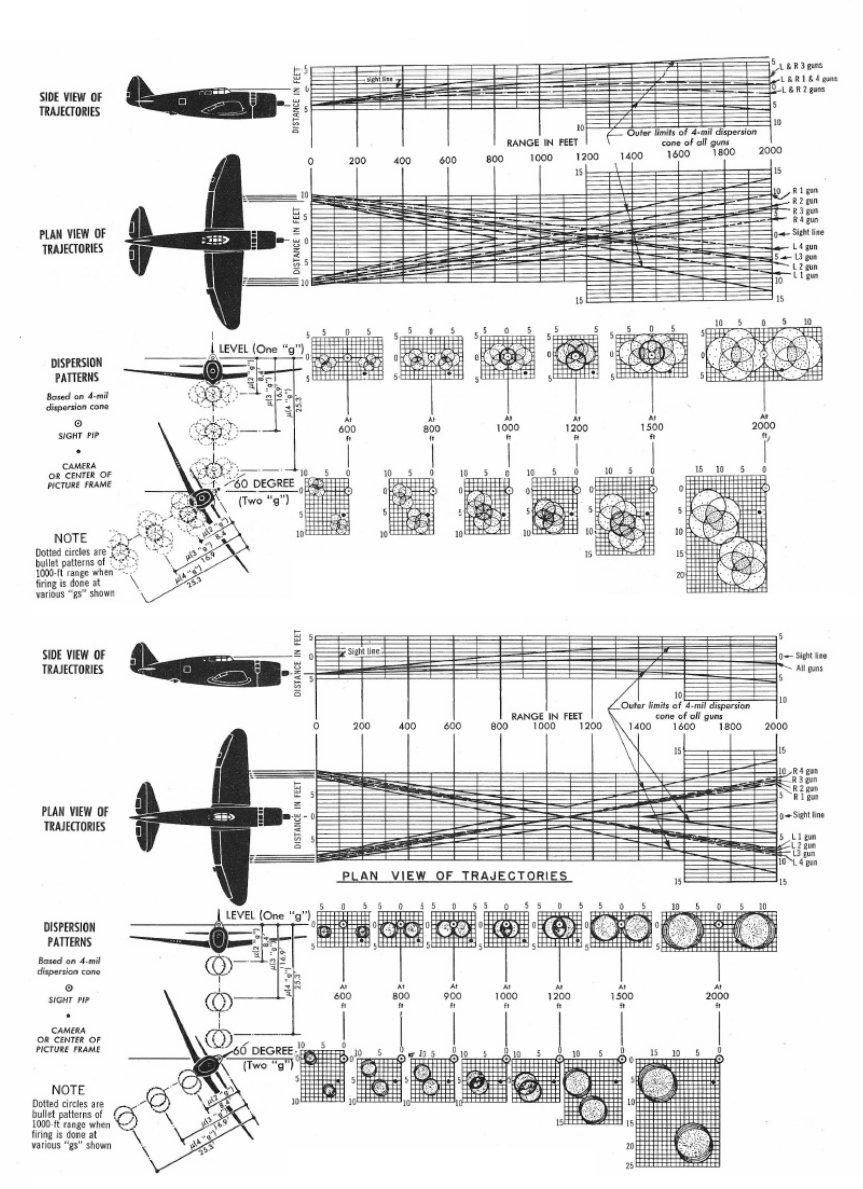
Two convergence schemes for the American Republic P-47 Thunderbolt fighter as shown in a 1945 manual. The top scheme shows a diamond pattern which narrows to about 10 feet (3 m) wide at a range of 1,200 ft (370 m). The bottom scheme converges the eight guns into a point at about 1,100 ft (340 m).

Early in World War II, the British were in favour of "pattern harmonisation", a shotgun-like tactic which disperses the fire of multiple guns to gain a greater chance of a hit. The Royal Air Force (RAF) tried various patterns of gun harmonisation, with the convergence area taking the form of a rectangle or a circle. In December 1939, No. 111 Squadron RAF adjusted its Hurricanes to fire into a wide rectangle that was 12 by 8 ft (3.7 by 2.4 m) at 750 ft (230 m). This was referred to as the "Dowding spread" because Air Chief Marshal Hugh Dowding advocated such a large pattern to make it more likely that a mediocre fighter pilot would obtain a hit. The pattern converged further with distance, tightening the most at about 1,200 ft (370 m) or even 1,950 ft (590 m), the latter reported by Len Deighton. New Zealand's top ace Colin Falkland Gray expressed frustration at the recommended scheme, saying that the wide pattern and long distance penalized those pilots who were excellent shots. Gray recommended the guns be converged to a point at 750 feet. South African ace Adolph "Sailor" Malan agreed so strongly with Gray that he went ahead and set his own guns to converge this way, subsequently telling fellow airmen how much better it worked. The British observed that too many German bombers were successfully disengaging from battle after taking many rounds of dispersed fire. It was decided to test a much tighter pattern. After evaluation in battle, by mid-1940 pattern harmonisation was dropped by the RAF in favour of "point harmonisation". Following the lead of Gray and Malan, British fighters were generally set to fire into a single point at 750 ft rather than a larger area. By September 1940, better results were reported.

Whatever pattern was chosen, the flexibility of the wings could contribute to a larger-than-intended convergence pattern, especially with thinner wings as on the Spitfire. The vibration of the engine, the twisting pull of the propeller, and the flexing of the wings in flight would cause movement of the gun mounting which would affect the aim. The normal vibration of the guns as they fired would also spread the shots; an intended point convergence was at best a somewhat larger grouping of shots within a circle. At a distance of 1,000 ft (300 m), the tightest practical grouping of shots would range throughout a circle about 4 ft (1.2 m) wide.

Furthermore, the physical arrangement of guns in the wing had an effect on the convergence pattern. The Spitfire's guns were spaced relatively far apart in each wing, which meant that their gunfire was more dispersed before and after the range of greatest convergence. The Hurricane's guns were closely spaced, allowing more confidence that a grouping of bullets from one wing would cause heavy damage, even if the other wing's bullets missed the target. While Spitfire squadrons might converge their wing guns at a different distance for each left–right pair, to give a deeper envelope of damage, Hurricane squadrons usually aligned the guns in each wing to shoot nearly parallel, with all gunfire coming together at the same range. As a result, the Hurricane outperformed the Spitfire in delivering damage to German bombers during the Battle of Britain.

Some American air units also converged their guns in a rectangle. USAAF Major James White described how the North American P-51 Mustangs of his 487th Fighter Squadron were harmonised to fire their six guns into a wide rectangle 10 by 6 ft (3.0 by 1.8 m) at 450 ft (140 m). The outer guns of the Mustang were 15.846 ft (4.830 m) apart, so this ten-foot box narrowed in width as the firing distance increased.

== Distance ==
The distance of the convergence point depended on the ballistic performance of the projectile. Standard early war machine gun rounds such as ones that were fired by the British .303 Browning machine guns did not travel as far as later heavy machine gun rounds or cannon shells, so the lighter rounds were focussed into a cluster or point at shorter distances. All machine gun rounds do more damage at closer distances, so a closer point was often preferred for increased damage, especially for target areas protected by steel plate, such as armoured cockpits. However, if a close point was chosen then a distant enemy might be safe from the fire of wing guns, the rounds passing ineffectually on both sides of him. The opposite situation was not so much of a problem; a distant bore-sight point would not usually stop a fighter from delivering damage at close range, though the hits would not be concentrated on target. Tactical decisions also dictated whether a fighter unit would choose a closer or farther away convergence point. A twisting and turning style of dogfighting might indicate a shorter distance, while energy tactics such as diving to gain a speed advantage might indicate a greater distance.

Early mark British Spitfire and Hurricane fighters firing the .303 round had their eight wing guns focussed into a convergence zone at 1,200 ft (370 m), 1,350 ft (410 m) or even 1,950 ft (590 m), depending on which source is consulted. Such longer distances were initially favoured by Air Chief Marshal Hugh Dowding, but combat experience showed that shorter distances were more effective, and the convergence distance was reduced to 750 ft (230 m) or even 360 ft (110 m). Various distances that were employed in World War II by American fighters using .50 cal (12.7 mm) heavy machine gun rounds include 500 ft (150 m), 750 ft (230 m), 900 ft (270 m) and 1,000 ft (300 m), with the longer distances favoured later in the war.

Some pilots preferred more than one point of convergence. In 1944 operating out of England, American Lieutenant Urban "Ben" Drew set the .50 cal guns of his North American P-51 Mustang "Detroit Miss" to converge at three points: 600 ft (180 m), 750 ft (230 m) and 900 ft (270 m), with the inboard guns aimed closer and the outboard guns farther away. Drew felt that this gave him a suitable concentration of fire over a deeper envelope of engagement distance.

Night fighter wing guns of all belligerents were often set to converge at relatively close distances such as 450 ft (140 m) for the UK. Night fighter tactics using wing guns called for a surreptitious approach on the tail of the enemy, surprising him with fire at a chosen distance.

Strafing ground targets from the air called for a greater harmonisation distance, to give the pilot time to register hits and then quickly pull up to prevent collision with the ground or the target. The allowed time was very brief: travelling at 250 to 300 mph (400 to 480 km/h), a pilot typically had less than two seconds to fire at the ground target and then pull up. If the targets were dispersed among tall trees, as were some German aircraft late in the war, a greater distance was essential to avoid collision with the trees. The American 86th Fighter Bomber Group flying Republic P-47 Thunderbolts increased the bore-sight distance of the eight .50 cal guns during operations in the Italian Alps in late 1944, to converge at 900 ft (270 m). This distance also proved effective for strafing attacks in southern Germany in 1945.

A very close convergence point proved devastatingly effective for some pilots. The highest scoring fighter pilot in the world, German Major Erich Hartmann, set the wing guns (later cannon) of his Bf 109 to converge at 50 m (160 ft) because of his preference for waiting to attack until very near his opponent. In the Pacific War in mid-1943, American Marine Fighting Squadron 213 harmonised the six .50 cal wing guns of their Mk I Vought F4U Corsairs to converge to a point 300 ft (90 m) ahead. The squadron's usual tactic was to dive upon an enemy from the front and slightly to one side (a high-side attack using full deflection) and fire when at the convergence distance. American ace Major Bill Chick of the 317th Fighter Squadron based in North Africa in January 1944 bore-sighted the guns of his Thunderbolt to converge at 300 ft (90 m) because he did not care for deflection shots and instead attacked his targets from the rear at that distance.

== Central guns ==
Fighters with central guns, mounted in the fuselage or a central gondola, typically aimed them straight ahead rather than converging them. A fighter such as the German Bf 109E "Emil" model carried a combination of central and wing guns; the wing guns were converged to a point but the central guns could always be counted upon to aim directly at the target.

The British Westland Whirlwind (four 20 mm cannon) and the American Lockheed P-38 Lightning (one 20 mm cannon and four .50 cal), both twin-engined fighters, carried the entirety of their gun armament in the nose, a configuration which concentrated the firepower at a broader range of distances, and did not require left–right harmonisation. The P-38 still required up–down harmonisation because its cannon, with its heavier rounds and different trajectory, needed to be inclined upward slightly more than the four machine guns. Soviet fighter design of the era favoured grouping all guns in the fuselage for accuracy and for keeping the wings as light as possible, resulting in improved manoeuvrability. In fact, many Soviet pilots flying western aircraft, such as the Bell P-39 Airacobra, directed their armourers to remove some or all wing guns.

The North American F-86 Sabre, a 1947 jet fighter-bomber design used by US forces in the Korean War, was equipped with six .50 cal machine guns, three mounted on each side of the nose, the two sides spaced approximately 4 ft (1.2 m) apart. These guns were harmonised to converge at 1,200 ft (370 m).

== See also ==
- Glossary of firearms terms
