= VMF-213 =

Marine Fighting Squadron 213
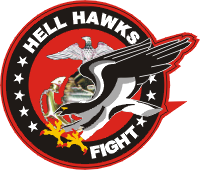
- VMF-213 Insignia
- Active: 1 July 1942 – 24 April 1946 Unknown - mid-1970s
- Country: United States
- Branch: USMC
- Type: Fighter squadron
- Role: Air interdiction
- Part of: Inactive
- Nickname(s): Hell Hawks
- Tail Code: EF
- Engagements: World War II * Philippines Campaign (1944–45) * Battle of Iwo Jima * Battle of Okinawa

Aircraft flown
- Fighter: F4U Corsair; F9F Panther

Marine Fighting Squadron 213 (VMF-213) was a reserve fighter squadron in the United States Marine Corps. Nicknamed the "Hell Hawks", the squadron fought during World War II in the Philippines and at the battles of Iwo Jima and Okinawa. With its assignment to the USS Essex (CV-9) and Air Group 4, VMF-213 along with VMF-124 was one of the first two Marine squadrons to augment carrier air groups during World War II. The squadron was credited with downing 117 enemy aircraft during the war.

== History ==
=== World War II ===
VMF-213 was formed 1 July 1942 at Marine Corps Air Station Ewa, Hawaii. The squadron left MCAS Ewa on 21 February 1943 and arrived at Espiritu Santo on 1 March 1943. They received their first F4U Corsairs while at Espiritu on 11 March 1943 and after a brief stint training they moved to Guadalcanal in April 1943. On 17 June 1943, VMF-213 relieved VMF-124 in the Russell Islands. While in the Solomons, VMF-213 participated in actions against New Georgia and Kahali and flew throughout the Solomon Islands until December 1943. In mid-1943, VMF-213 harmonised the six .50 inch wing guns of their Mk I Vought F4U Corsairs to converge to a point 300 ft (90 m) ahead. The squadron's usual tactic was to dive upon an enemy from the front and slightly to one side (a high-side attack using full deflection) and fire when at the convergence distance.

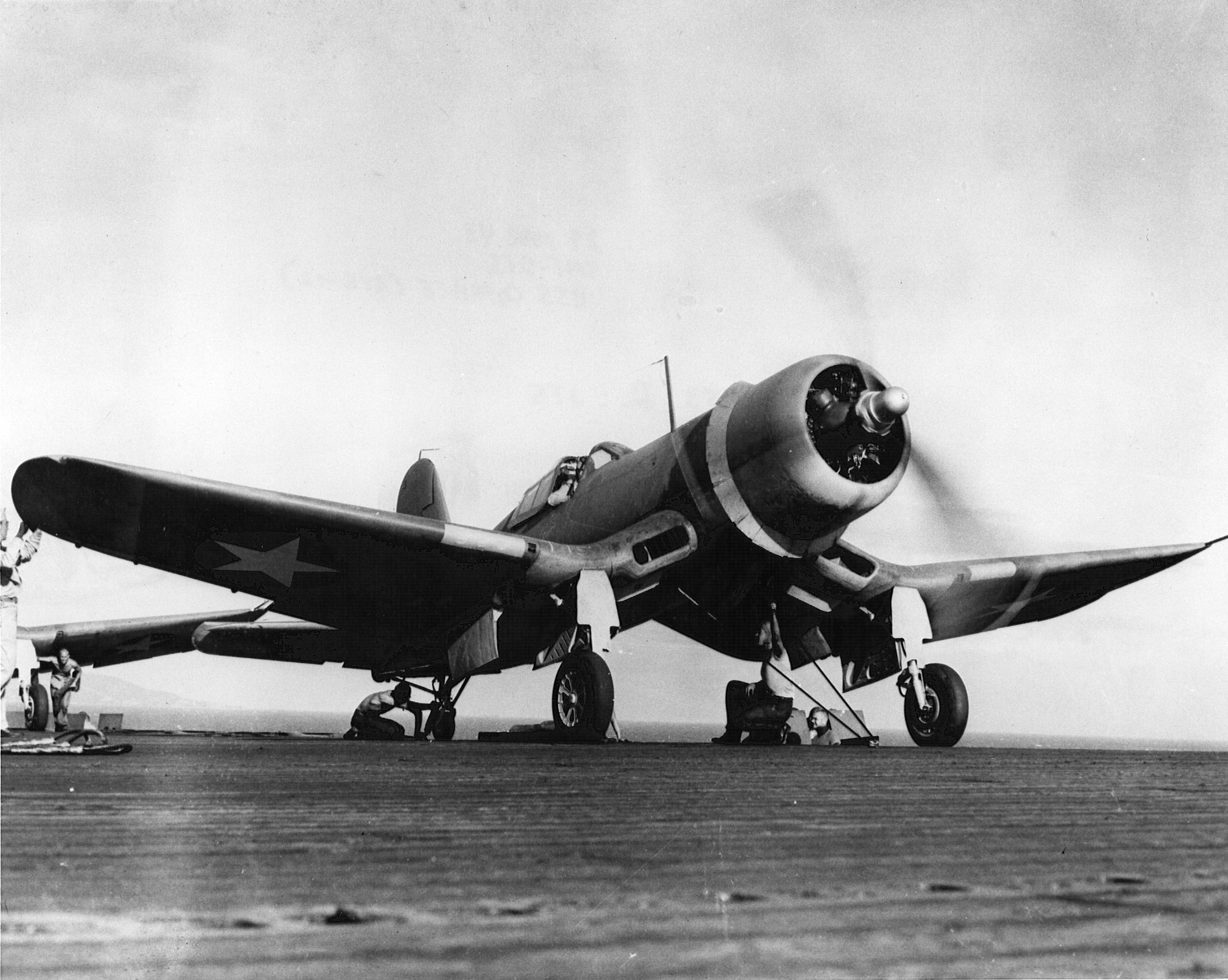
An F4U-1 Corsair from VMF-213, warming up on the flight deck of the escort carrier USS Copahee (CVE-12), on 29 March 1943.

The squadron returned to the United States for reorganization and training at Marine Corps Air Station Mojave, California. Their training was rigorous which can be seen by the daily record they set for Marine West Coast fighter squadrons in June 1944, when they flew 272.2 hours with the squadron's 21 aircraft averaging 13 hours each. With VMF-124, they departed the United States on 18 September 1944 on board the USS Ticonderoga (CV-14) and USS Hancock (CV-19). After training at MCAS Ewa they met up with the USS Essex at Ulithi on 9 December 1944 and sailed west. While on board the Essex, as part of Task Force 58, VMF-213 along with VMF-124 participated in actions against Lingayen, Luzon, Formosa, Tokyo, Iwo Jima, and Okinawa. During this time they became one of the first US military units ever involved in Vietnam when they struck at Japanese Tojos that had stopped at Tan Son Nhut Air Base to refuel on 12 January 1945.

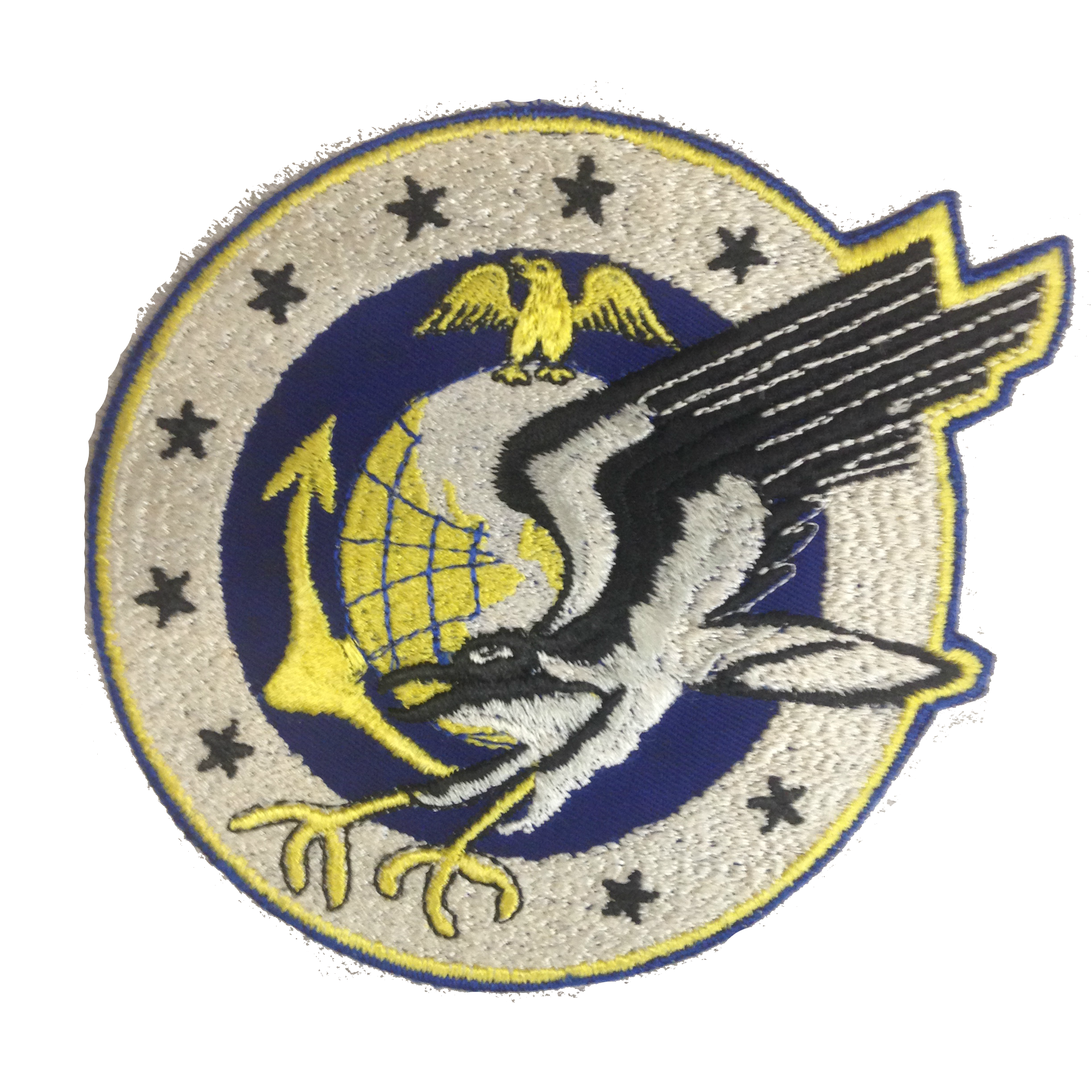
Photo of an original VMF-213 patch made in 1943.

Captain James N. Cupp was a double flying ace with VMF-213 in the Solomon Islands. From July to September 1943 he scored at least 12 aerial victories. He received the Navy Cross and three Distinguished Flying Crosses during his service with the Hell Hawks.

=== Reserve years ===
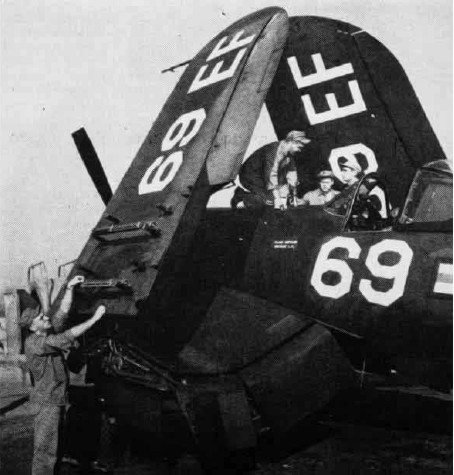
A VMF-213 at Marine Corps Air Station El Toro in 1947.

Following the war the squadron was reactivated in the Marine Corps Reserve and based out of Naval Air Station Twin Cities, Minneapolis, Minnesota. On 9 June 1956 a Grumman F9F-4 Panther from VMF-213 crashed into a row of houses near Wold-Chamberlain Field, striking the home at 5820 46th Avenue South, Minneapolis, Minnesota. In addition to killing the pilot the crash killed five and injured twelve on the ground, most of whom were young children.

== Squadron Aces ==
Name	Victories
James N. Cupp	13.0
Sheldon O. Hall	6.0
John L. Morgan Jr.	8.5
Wilbur J. Thomas	18.5
Edward O. Shaw	13.0
Milton N. Vedder	6.0
Gregory J. Weissenberger	5.0

== Unit awards ==
Since the beginning of World War II, the United States military has honored various units for extraordinary heroism or outstanding non-combat service. This information is compiled by the United States Marine Corps History Division and is certified by the Commandant of the Marine Corps.

Streamer	Award	Year(s)	Additional Info
A streamer with red, gold, and blue horizontal stripes with a bronze star in the center	Presidential Unit Citation Streamer with one Bronze Star	3 – 22 Jan 1945, 16 Feb – 1 Mar 1945	Battle of Luzon, Battle of Iwo Jima
A gold streamer with smaller red and blue horizontal stripes and four bronze stars in the center	Asiatic-Pacific Campaign Streamer with four Bronze Stars	1943–1945	Consolidation of Solomon Islands, New Georgia Group Operation, Luzon Operation, Iwo Jima Operation, Okinawa Gunto Operation
A red streamer with horizontal rainbow stripes along the top and bottom	World War II Victory Streamer	1942–1945	Pacific War
A red streamer with a horizontal gold stripe and three bronze stars in the center	National Defense Service Streamer with two Bronze Stars	1951–1954, 1961–1974	Korean War, Vietnam War

== See also ==
- United States Marine Corps Aviation
- List of United States Marine Corps aircraft squadrons
- List of decommissioned United States Marine Corps aircraft squadrons
