= James N. Cupp =

United States Marine Corp aviator

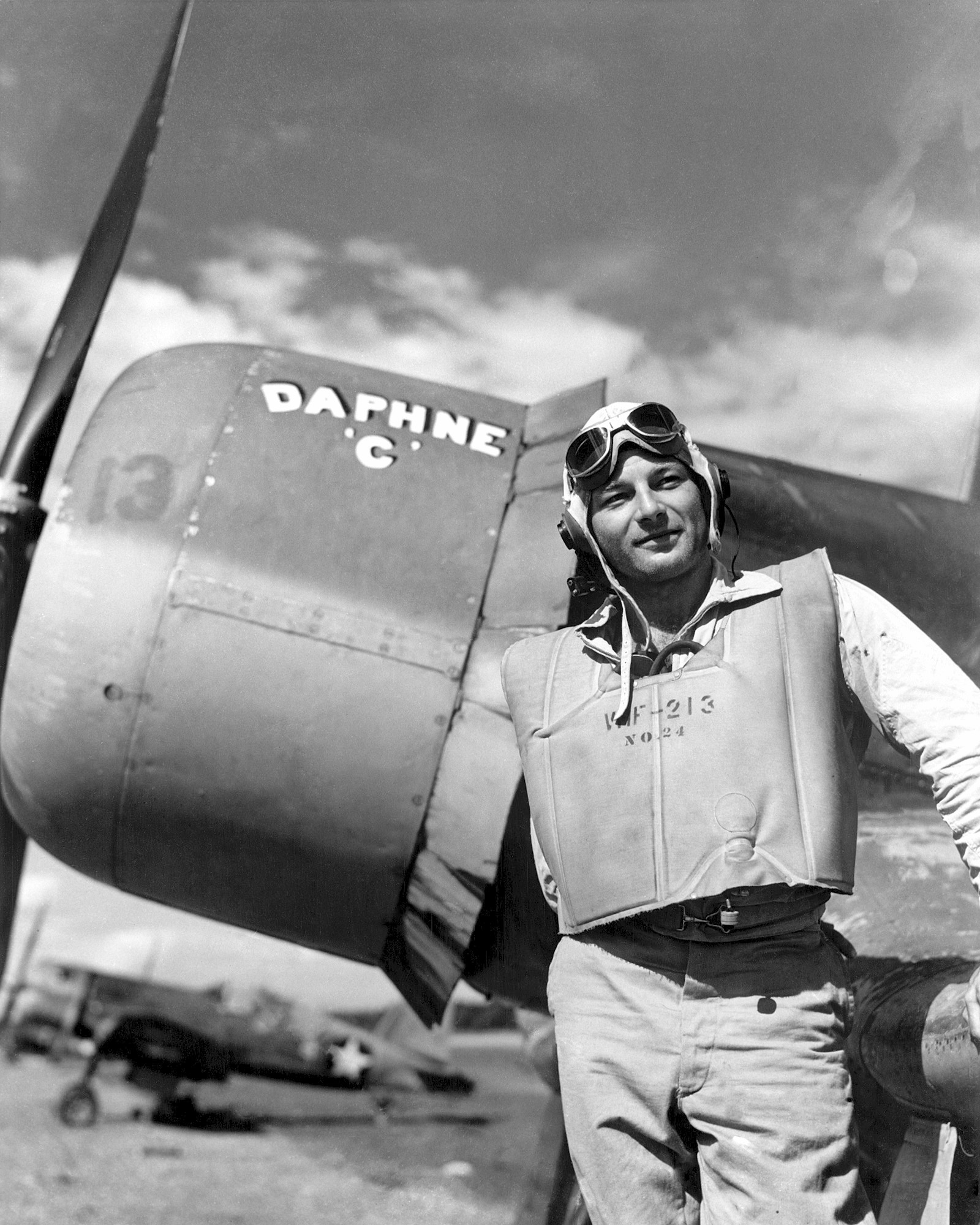
- Cupp with his F4U Corsair, Daphne "C", June 1943
- Born: 28 March 1921; Corning, Iowa, U.S.
- Died: 2 June 2004 (aged 83); Manassas, Virginia, U.S.
- Burial place: Stonewall Memory Gardens, Manassas, Virginia
- Military career
- Allegiance: United States
- Branch: United States Marine Corps
- Service years: 1941–1968
- Rank: Colonel
- Nickname: Jim
- Service number: 0-9004
- Unit: VMF-213
- Commands: VMO-6; HQ Squadron, 1st Marine Aircraft Wing; VMFT-10; Marine Air Control Squadron 1
- Conflicts: World War II; Korean War
- Awards: Navy Cross; Distinguished Flying Cross (4); Bronze Star Medal with "V"; Purple Heart; Air Medal; Navy Commendation Medal with "V"

James Norman Cupp (28 March 1921 – 2 June 2004) was a United States Marine Corps aviator during World War II. Cupp was a double flying ace with at least 12 aerial victories in the Solomon Islands during three months of World War II. He was a recipient of the Navy Cross, the navy's second highest military decoration for valor and was a four-time recipient of the Distinguished Flying Cross. Also a Korean War veteran, he retired as a colonel to Manassas, Virginia, in 1968.

== Early life ==
James Norman Cupp was born in Corning, Iowa, on 28 March 1921. He graduated from high school in Red Oak, Iowa, in 1938. He attended the University of Iowa for two years, taking his Sophomore finals two months early so he could join the Navy V-5 flight training program. In college, Cupp was an avid swimmer and diver. He was also a member of Dolphin Fraternity, a national honorary swimming organization.

== Naval career ==
=== World War II ===
Cupp enlisted in the Navy on 15 May 1941 and entered the V-5 flight training program. He graduated at Naval Air Station Corpus Christi, Texas 9 January 1942 and was commissioned a second lieutenant in the United States Marine Corps, 27 February 1942. On 3 March 1942, he married Daphne Snider, of Fairfield, Iowa. Cupp then attended aerial photography training at Naval Air Station Pensacola, Florida.

Cupp was attached to VMF-213, the Hell Hawks, in September 1942 at Marine Corps Air Station Ewa and later flew the Vought F4U Corsair. He had his crew paint Daphne "C", for his wife, on the engine cowling of his Corsair. He arrived at the Solomon Islands for his first combat tour on 3 April 1943. Cupp scored his first aerial victory on 15 July 1943 and was an ace three days later. During his tour he was credited with 13 1/2 or 13 aerial victories based on reports by his wingmen. According to Guttman (2005), he was officially credited with 12 victories.

On 20 Sept. 1943, while on dawn patrol with two other squadron pilots, 1st Lt. F.V. Avery and 2nd Lt. J.M. Walley, Captain Cupp was shot down north of Kolombangara by a G4M1 Betty with an improvised gun unexpectedly mounted in its bomb bay; he was severely burned. He spent the next 18 months recovering from second-degree burns of his face, right hand and forearm and third-degree burns of both legs in hospitals, primarily Oak Knoll Naval Hospital in Oakland, California, according to the log books of 1st Lt. William C. "Doc" Livingood Sr., M.D., flight surgeon of VMF 213 in 1943. After that, he served as a Naval flight instructor. The war ended before he could return to the Pacific theater.

=== Later career ===
Cupp served in the Korean War and received his fourth Distinguished Flying Cross for service during the Battle of Chosin Reservoir where he was an air officer on the ground, responsible for directing close air support operations.

After World War II, he served as commanding officer for VMO-6 in Qingdao, China, HQ Squadron, 1st Marine Aircraft Wing in Tianjin, China, Marine Detachment (MARDET) Naval Air Station New Orleans, MARDET Naval Air Station Glenview, VMFT-10 at Marine Corps Air Station El Toro and Marine Air Control Squadron 1 in Taiwan.

Colonel Cupp retired to Manassas, Virginia, in 1968, selling real estate until 1973. He died on 2 June 2004 and was buried at Stonewall Memory Gardens, Manassas, Virginia.

== Awards and honors ==
His decorations include the Navy Cross, four Distinguished Flying Cross awards, Bronze Star Medal with "V" Device, Purple Heart, Air Medal, Navy Commendation Medal with "V" Device, four Presidential Unit Citations and other campaign awards.

Naval Aviator insignia
Navy Cross	Distinguished Flying Cross w/ three 5/16" Gold Stars	Bronze Star Medal w/ Combat "V"
Purple Heart	Air Medal	Combat Action Ribbon w/ one 5/16" Gold Star
Navy Commendation Medal w/ Combat "V"	Navy and Marine Corps Presidential Unit Citation w/ three 3/16" Bronze Stars	American Defense Service Medal
China Service Medal	American Campaign Medal	Asiatic–Pacific Campaign Medal w/ two 3/16" Bronze Stars
World War II Victory Medal	National Defense Service Medal w/ one 3/16" Bronze Star	Korean Service Medal w/ four 3/16" Bronze Stars
Republic of Korea Presidential Unit Citation	United Nations Korea Medal	Korean War Service Medal

=== Navy Cross citation ===
Navy Cross

The President of the United States of America takes pleasure in presenting the Navy Cross to Captain James Norman Cupp, United States Marine Corps Reserve, for extraordinary heroism and distinguished service in the line of his profession as Division Leader and a Pilot in Marine Fighting Squadron Two Hundred Thirteen (VMF-213), Marine Air Group Eleven (MAG-11), First Marine Aircraft Wing, in aerial combat against enemy Japanese forces in the Solomon Islands Area, on 18 September 1943. While leading his three-fighter division on a patrol over our base on Vella Lavella, Captain Cupp boldly intercepted an overwhelming force of fifteen hostile dive bombers and their fighter escorts threatening our installations. Promptly engaging the enemy, he personally blasted four bombers from the sky and assisted in the shooting down of another. By his superb skill, daring initiative and devotion to duty, Captain Cupp contributed to the success of his squadron and upheld the highest traditions of the United States Naval Service.

— Commander South Pacific, 19 March 1947

== Bibliography ==
- Cupp, James N. (May 1958). "Our Friend the Helicopter". Marine Corps Gazette. ISSN 0025-3170.

== See also ==
- List of World War II aces from the United States
