= War (disambiguation) =

A war is a large-scale armed conflict and the term is used as a metaphor for non-military conflicts.

War or WAR may also refer to:

== Places ==
- War, West Virginia
- War Creek, a stream in West Virginia
- Warwickshire county in England, standard code

== Music ==
=== Performers ===
- War (band), an American 1970s funk band

=== Albums ===
- War (Bolt Thrower album), 2010
- War (Born from Pain album), 2006
- War (Demon Hunter album), 2019
- War (U2 album), 1983
- War (War album), by the American band
- War (2019 soundtrack), soundtrack for the 2019 Indian film by Vishal–Shekhar, Sanchit Balhara and Ankit Balhara
- The War (album), a 2017 album by South Korean-Chinese boy group EXO
- W.A.R. (We Are Renegades), by American hip hop artist Pharoahe Monch
- "War", an EP by rapper Jasiah

=== Songs ===
- "The War" (Angels & Airwaves song)
- "War" (Bob Marley song), 1976
- "War" (Bone Thugs-n-Harmony song), 1998
- "War" (Drake song), 2019
- "War" (Henry Cow song), 1975
- "War" (King Von song), 2022
- "The War" (The New Power Generation song)
- "War" (Pop Smoke song), featuring Lil Tjay, 2019
- "War" (The Temptations song), 1970, also covered by Edwin Starr
- "The War Song", by Culture Club
- "War", by Amorphis from Halo
- "War", by ArrDee and Aitch, 2022
- "War", by Bathory from Bathory
- "War", by Burzum from Burzum
- "War", by The Devil Wears Prada from 8:18
- "War", by Devin Townsend from Infinity
- "WAR!", by DragonForce from Reaching into Infinity
- "War", by Good Charlotte from Youth Authority
- "War", by Idles from Ultra Mono
- "War", by James Horner from Avatar: Music from the Motion Picture
- "War", by Jay Sean from All or Nothing
- "War", by Joe Satriani from The Extremist
- "The War", a 2020 song by Joyner Lucas from ADHD
- "War", by Judas Priest from Nostradamus
- "The War", a 2016 song by Leeland from Invisible
- "War", by Linkin Park from The Hunting Party
- "War", by Meshuggah from Rare Trax
- "War", by Nas from Street's Disciple
- "War", by OutKast from Speakerboxxx/The Love Below
- "War", by Persuader from The Fiction Maze
- "War", by Poets of the Fall from Twilight Theater
- "War", by Sean Kingston from Tomorrow
- "War", by Shadows Fall from Retribution (uses same lyrics as Bob Marley's song "War")
- "War?", by System of a Down from System of a Down
- "War", by Goo Goo Dolls from Chaos in Bloom
- "War", by Venom Inc., 2017
- "War", by War of Ages from Dominion
- "War", by Wumpscut from Embryodead
- "War!", by Zach Callison from A Picture Perfect Hollywood Heartbreak
- "Street Fighter (War)", by Sick Puppies from Tri-Polar; used in commercials for the game Street Fighter IV
- "War" by Chief Keef from Back From The Dead 2, 2014

== Computing ==
- Write after read, a data dependency hazard
- WAR (file format) (Web application ARchive), a file format used to package Java applications
- Early versions of Decwar, a pioneering multi-user computer game
- War dialing, the act of detecting online, modem-accessible systems by having a computer dial a set of numbers
- Wardriving, the act of detecting wireless networking systems detecting by driving around with a Wi-Fi-equipped device
- Warchalking, notices drawn to alert people to the presence of Wi-Fi networks

== Organizations ==
- White Aryan Resistance, an Indiana neo-Nazi white supremacist organization
- Wyatt Archaeological Research, an organization founded by amateur archaeologist Ron Wyatt
- Voina (meaning "War" in Russian), a Moscow-based performance artist collective
- Women Against Registry, a sex offender law reform organization
- De WAR, a Dutch centre for arts and citizen science in Amersfoort

== Wrestling ==
- WAR (wrestling promotion), a Japanese professional wrestling promotion known as Wrestle Association R
- Wrestling Academy Rorbas, a Swiss professional wrestling promotion
- W.A.R. Wrestling, an American independent wrestling promotion

== Games ==
- War (card game), a two player card game typically using Anglo-American playing card deck
- A Brazilian variation of the board game Risk
- Warhammer Online: Age of Reckoning, a 2008 MMO video game
- W.A.R., a 1986 video game

== Film ==
=== Genre ===
- War film, a genre of film

=== Films ===
- The War (1994 film), a 1994 film starring Elijah Wood and Kevin Costner
- War (2002 film), a 2002 Russian film about the Second Chechen War
- War (2007 film), a 2007 Jet Li and Jason Statham film
- War, Inc., a 2008 American political satire film
- War (2014 film), a 2014 Swiss film
- War (2019 film), an Indian action thriller directed by Siddharth Anand, part of the YRF Spy Universe

== Television ==
=== Episodes ===
- "War" 21 Thunder episode 6 (2017)
- "War", Æon Flux season 2, episode 5 (1992)
- "War", Amazon episode 10 (1999)
- "War", Between season 1, episode 6 (2015)
- "War", Charles in Charge season 1, episode 4 (1984)
- "War", Da Ali G Show season 2, episode 2 (2003)
- "War", Dark Ages episode 3 (1999)
- "War" Desire episode 27 (2006)
- "War!", Diplomatic Immunity episode 5 (2009)
- "War", Fubar Age of Computer episode 6 (2017)
- "War", Garo: Gold Storm Sho episode 16 (2015)
- "War", Garo: Yami o Terasu Mono episode 18 (2013)
- "War", Hap and Leonard season 1, episode 5 (2016)
- "War", Heartburn Hotel series 1, episode 4 (1998)
- "War", Hey Dude season 5, episode 13 (1991)
- "War", La Femme Nikita season 1, episode 17 (1997)
- "War", Lights Out (2011) episode 13 (2011)
- "War", Mary & George episode 7 (2024)
- "War", Max Headroom season 1, episode 5 (1987)
- "War", Not Going Out series 11, episode 5 (2021)
- "War", Once Upon a Time in Iraq episode 1 (2020)
- "War", Prisoners of Gravity season 3, episode 6 (1991)
- "War", Private Practice season 3, episode 21 (2010)
- "War", Special Squad episode 16 (1984)
- "War", Squid Game: The Challenge episode 3 (2023)
- "War", Suits season 2, episode 16 (2013)
- "War", Super Pumped episode 3 (2022)
- "War", The Comic Strip Presents... series 1, episode 2 (1983)
- "War", The Crown season 4, episode 10 (2020)
- "War", The Last Czars episode 4 (2019)
- "War", Unreal season 1, episode 1 (2016)
- "War", You Can't Do That on Television season 5, episode 24 (1985)
- "War", Young Justice season 2, episode 15 (2013)
- "The War", A Dance to the Music of Time episode 3 (1997)
- "The War", Alien Encounters season 3, episode 5 (2014)
- "The War", Boy Meets World season 7, episode 15 (2000)
- "The War", Crime Story season 1, episode 6 (1986)
- "The War", Fright Krewe season 1, episode 10 (2023)
- "The War", Ideal season 4, episode 5 (2008)
- "The War", Koose Munisamy Veerappan episode 3 (2023)
- "The War", Tales of Zestiria the X season 1, episode 11 (2016)

=== Shows ===
- War (miniseries), a 1983 Canadian television miniseries
- The War (miniseries), a 2007 television documentary about World War II by Ken Burns
- The Chaser's War on Everything or simply The War, an Australian television comedy series
- War (TV series), a 2026 legal drama television series

== Literature ==
=== Fiction ===
- War (Guerre), a 1934 novel by Louis Ferdinand Céline
- War (Le Clézio novel), a 1970 novel by J. M. G. Le Clézio
- War, a 1994 play by Dennis Foon
- War (Hawke novel), 1996, by Simon Hawke; the third installment in the Birthright series
- War, a 1999 novel by Peter Lerangis; the fourth installment in the Watchers series
- Aliens vs. Predator: War, a 1999 novel based on Alien vs. Predator by S. D. Perry; the third installment in The Machiko Noguchi Saga
- War, a 2003 collection of poems by Harold Pinter
- War: Stories of Conflict, a 2005 short story anthology edited by Michael Morpurgo
- Sparrowhawk Six: War, a 2006 novel by Edward Cline; the sixth installment in the Sparrowhawk series
- War: Tales of Conflict and Strife, a 2017 short story collection by Roald Dahl
- War: A Novel of the House War, a 2019 novel by Michelle West; the eighth installment in The House War series
- The War, a 1983 novel by Michael McDowell; the fourth installment in the Blackwater series
- "War" (short story), a short story by Luigi Pirandello

=== Non-fiction ===
- War — What For?, a 1910 book by George Ross Kirkpatrick
- War, the Creator, a 1915 magazine essay and 1916 book by Gelett Burgess
- War: Its Conduct and Legal Results, a 1915 book by T. Baty and J. H. Morgan
- War, This War and the Sermon on the Mount, a 1915 book by Burnett Hillman Streeter concerning World War I
- War: Its Nature, Cause and Cure, a 1923 book by G. Lowes Dickinson
- War: Its Causes, Consequences and Cure, a 1923 book by Kirby Page
- War (Junger book), 2010, by Sebastian Junger about Afghanistan
- War (Woodward book), 2024, by Bob Woodward
- The War: Speech of Hon. E.C. Benedict, in the Assembly of the State of New York, April 6, 1864, an 1864 work by Erastus C. Benedict
- The War: What Should Be Said About It in the Schools?, a 1914 book by Fannie Fern Andrews
- The War: A Memoir (La Douleur), a 1985 memoir by Marguerite Duras
- War, Literature & the Arts, an American military literary magazine in publication since 1989

=== Comics ===
- War comics, a genre of comics
- War (Marvel Comics), several Marvel Comics characters
- War, a 1975–1984 ongoing series published by Charlton Comics
- The War (comics), a 1989 Marvel Comics limited series

=== Periodicals ===
- WAR (newspaper), a neo-Nazi newspaper

== Visual arts ==
- War (Böcklin painting), two 1896 oil paintings by Arnold Böcklin
- The War (Dix engravings), a 1924 series of etchings by Otto Dix
- The War (Dix triptych), a 1932 oil painting by Otto Dix
- War (Rego painting), a 2003 pastel on paper by Paula Rego

== Other uses ==
- The War (boxing), a 1985 bout between Marvin Hagler and Thomas Hearns
- War language, spoken in the Indian subcontinent
- Waray language in the Philippines
- Winchester Automatic Rifle
- Wins Above Replacement, a sabermetric baseball statistic
- War, one of the Four Horsemen of the Apocalypse

== See also ==
- Wars (disambiguation)
- Warr (disambiguation)
- Civil War (disambiguation)
- Cold War (disambiguation)
- Great War (disambiguation)
- World War (disambiguation)
