= Dry Fork (Tug Fork tributary) =

Coordinates: 37°27′45″N 81°49′03″W

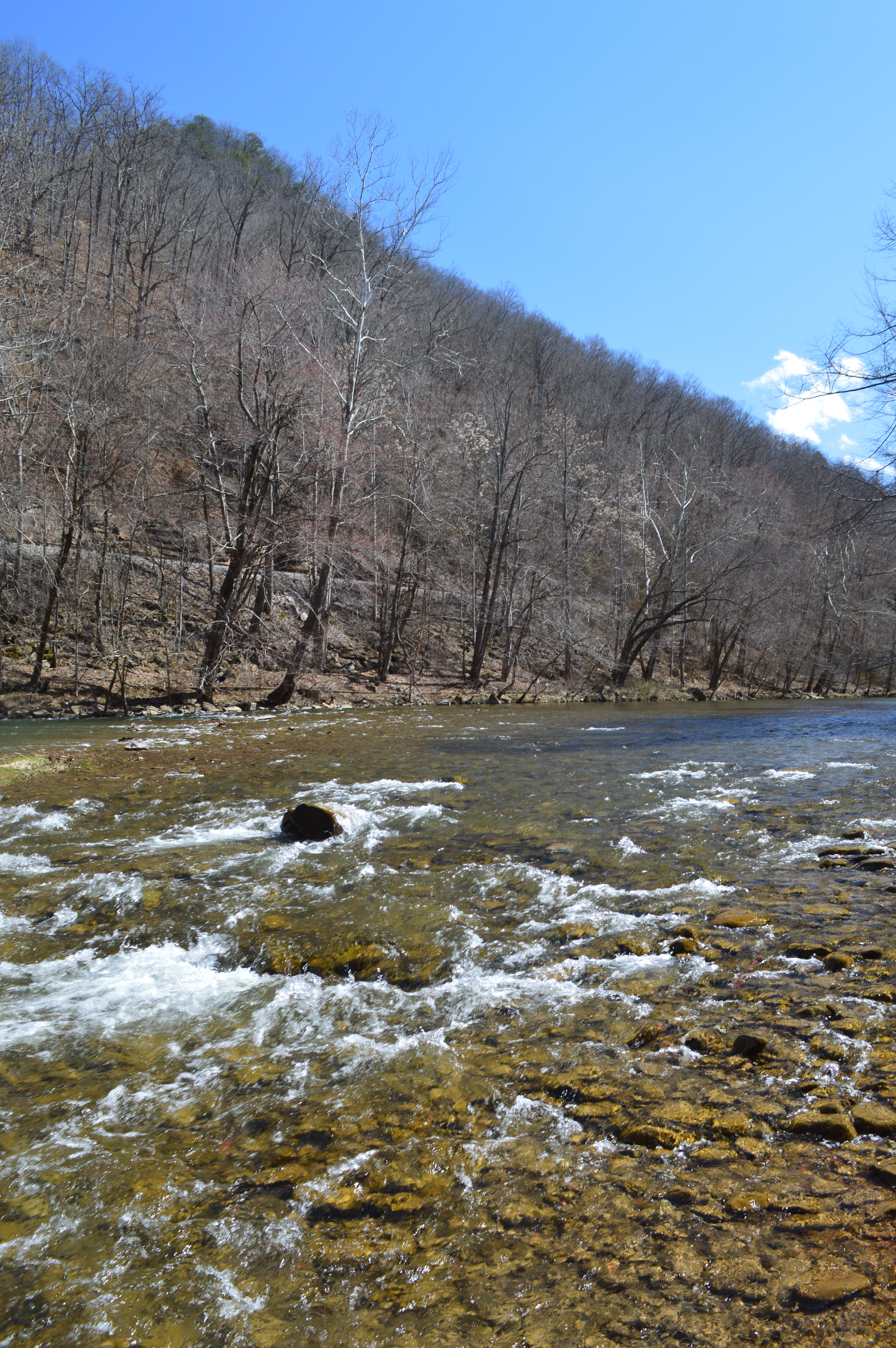
- Flowing through McDowell County

Location
- Country: United States

Physical characteristics
- Source
  - location: Stony Ridge near Adria, Tazewell County, Virginia
- Mouth
  - location: Tug Fork at Iaeger, McDowell County, West Virginia

The Dry Fork is a 47.7-mile-long (76.8 km) tributary of the Tug Fork, belonging to the Ohio River watershed. The river is located in McDowell County, West Virginia, and Tazewell County, Virginia, in the United States. The mouth of the Dry Fork into the Tug Fork is located at Iaeger.

== Variant names ==
According to the United States Geological Survey's Geographic Names Information System, the Dry Fork has been known by the following names throughout its history:

- Crane Creek
- Mud Fork
- South Fork

== Tributaries ==
Tributary streams are listed from source to mouth.

- Lick Branch
- Ray Fork
- Bills Branch
- Dick Creek
  - Laurel Fork
- Mile Branch
- Beech Fork
- Vall Creek
- Kewee Creek
- Big Branch
- Jacobs Fork
  - Cucumber Creek
- Johns Branch
- War Creek
- Barrenshe Creek
- Pruett Branch
- Threefork Branch
- Bartley Creek
  - Buck Fork
- Johnnycake Hollow
- Atwell Branch
- Little Slate Branch
  - Right Fork
- Dry Branch
- Bradshaw Creek
- Oozley Branch
- Hurricane Branch
- Fishtrap Branch
- Beartown Branch
- Little Staunch Branch
- Staunch Branch
- Grapevine Branch
- Betsy Branch
- Crane Creek
  - Left Fork
  - Laurel Fork
- Mile Branch
- Straight Branch
- Coon Branch

== List of cities and towns along the Dry Fork ==
- Apple Grove, West Virginia
- Atwell, West Virginia
- Avondale, West Virginia
- Bartley, West Virginia
- Beartown, West Virginia
- Berwind, West Virginia
- Bradshaw, West Virginia
- Canebrake, West Virginia
- Carlos, West Virginia
- Dunford Village, Virginia
- English, West Virginia
- Excelsior, West Virginia
- Garland, West Virginia
- Iaeger, West Virginia
- Lex, West Virginia
- Lomax, West Virginia
- Raysal, West Virginia
- Rift, West Virginia
- Union City, West Virginia
- Vallscreek, West Virginia
- War, West Virginia
- Yukon, West Virginia

== See also ==
- List of Virginia rivers
- List of West Virginia rivers
