= Carl Rutherford =

American musician

- Born: April 25, 1929; War, West Virginia, United States
- Died: January 28, 2006 (aged 76) California, United States
- Genres: Piedmont blues, country blues, Appalachian music
- Occupation(s): Guitarist, singer, songwriter
- Instrument(s): Guitar, dobro, banjo, vocals
- Years active: 1950s–2006
- Labels: Music Maker

Carl Rutherford (April 25, 1929 – January 28, 2006) was an American Piedmont blues, country blues, and Appalachian music guitarist, singer and songwriter.

== Life and career ==
Rutherford was born in War, McDowell County, West Virginia, United States. His family's roots in McDowell County could be traced to the 1890s. He was born with spina bifida, and his parents did not enter a name on his birth certificate, not expecting him to survive. He learned to play the slide guitar from his uncle Will Muncy's tuition. Muncy owned reissued records of Frank Hutchison and, by 1942, Rutherford had learned to play in open tuning with a closed pocketknife as a slide, imitating Hutchison's technique. The thumb-and-finger banjo picking of his mother, coupled with his uncle's teaching, left Rutherford picking the guitar with the thumb providing an alternating bass rhythm while the forefinger played the melody. In time he mastered playing rhythm, bass and lead guitar, plus the dobro and banjo.

At the age of 18, Rutherford went to work for the Olga Coal Company in their coal mines, after paying someone, because of his disability, to pass the physical on his behalf. After a mere two weeks in the job, Rutherford attended a week of funerals after witnessing first hand a catastrophic mining accident. He found it hard to return to his duties, but he determined to help his father pay off the cost of purchasing some land. Once the funds were secured after working another two years at the mine, Rutherford relocated to California. Deeply moved by the hardship he witnessed underground, Rutherford decided to try to preserve the music and style of playing reminiscent of that heard during the 1920s. In July 1950, Rutherford found employment in the logging camps around Redding, California. In addition to his daily work, Rutherford played where he could in the evenings and at weekends to supplement those earnings. In 1975, Rutherford moved from California to Warriormine, West Virginia, by then a well-seasoned musician.

Rutherford played at the Vandalia Gathering in Charleston, West Virginia in 1978, both solo and then with Hazel Dickens. (He was given the Vandalia Award in 2004.) In 1995, after years of performing on a semi-professional basis, Rutherford came to the attention of Music Maker. From them he received sustenance and emergency relief grants, and was given the opportunity to record an album. Rutherford had been photographed by Music Maker playing a guitar in his lap in Pinnacle, North Carolina in 1998. By this time, due to the ravages of black lung from his mine working days, Rutherford was reliant on a nebulizer. Usage kept his breathing under control as Rutherford noted, "I was sounding like Louis Armstrong before that." In addition to Rutherford (vocals, guitar, dobro), Jim O'Keefe (bass, backing vocals) and Abe Reid (harmonica), Music Maker supplied the notable electric guitarist Cool John Ferguson. Recording songs he had amassed from his life working in coal, timber, and in music took place in his own cabin in 2001. Music Maker issued the recording, with many of the songs on Turn Off the Fear related to the lives of coal miners. On the title track, he sang "You’ve got to turn off the fear, when you come down into here". In "Last Handloader", Rutherford noted how machinery was making many miners redundant. "Taking The Tops Off My Pretty Mountains" contained the lyric "they're taking the coal and just leaving dirty clay". Whereas another of his self-penned songs, "Little Annie", related the tragedy of 91 men being killed when the Pond Creek No. 1 mine in Bartley, West Virginia exploded on January 10, 1940. Relatives waited outside for days to see if their loved ones survived, or later, if their bodies would be recovered. Rutherford sang "Don't just stand and wring your hands, they brought out so many, none of them was your man."

Rutherford's tracks "Long Black Limousine", "Last Handloader", and "Flyin' High, Walkin' Tall," all appeared on the 2005 compilation album, The Last & Lost Survivors. "West Virginia Breakdown" and "Precious Memories" (with Cootie Stark) were included on Treasure Box (2006); while "Blues, Sweet Blues" was on Blues Sweet Blues (2008) and "The Old Rugged Cross" on We Are The Music Makers! (2014).

On May 5, 2002, in Durham, North Carolina, a street festival featured a number of artists from the Music Maker stable, including Rutherford, Cool John Ferguson, John Dee Holeman, Lightnin' Wells, Little Pink Anderson, and Drink Small. Rutherford was also noted in the book Music Makers: Portraits and Songs from the Roots of America (2004). Rutherford also took the opportunity to perform at the Portsmouth Blues Festival in New Hampshire, the National Guitar Festival in North Carolina, and at Ferrum Blues Week in West Virginia.

He later moved back to California to reside with his daughter.

Rutherford died from emphysema on January 28, 2006, at the age of 76. Upon his death, Music Maker arranged, as per Rutherford's wishes, for his body to be donated to the Duke University School of Medicine.

== Discography ==
Year	Title	Record label	Track listing	Credits
2001	Turn Off the Fear	Music Maker	1. "Shasta Daylight"; 2. "Flyin' High, Walkin' Tall"; 3. "Turn Off the Fear"; 4. "In The Pines"; 5. "Waterin' Hole Blues"; 6. "Last Handloader"; 7. "The Old Rugged Cross"; 8. "Back Home to West Virginia"; 9. "Long Black Limousine"; 10. "Love Can't Fly on Broken Wings"; 11. "Little Annie"; 12. "Takin' The Tops Off My Pretty Mountains"	Vocals, guitar, dobro – Carl Rutherford; Bass, backing vocals – Jim O'Keefe; Electric guitar – Cool John Ferguson; Harmonica – Abe Reid

== See also ==
- Music of West Virginia
- List of country blues musicians
