= Warre =

Warre is a surname, and may refer to:

- Edmond Warre (1837–1920), English rower and head master of Eton College
- Émile Warré, French beekeeper who invented the Warré Hive
- Francis Warre Warre-Cornish (1839–1916), British scholar and writer
- Felix Warre (1879–1953), English rower
- Sir Henry Warre (1819-1898), British Army officer
- Richard Warre (c. 1649 – 1730), English official
- Sir William Warre (1784–1853), British Army officer

== See also ==
- Warre baronets
- Warre (ship)
- Warr (surname)
