= Freedom (Junger book) =

Nonfiction book by Sebastian Junger

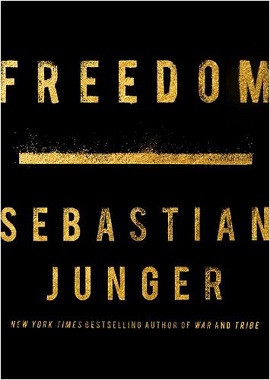
- Author: Sebastian Junger
- Language: English
- Subject: Freedom, Community, Philosophy
- Genre: Creative nonfiction
- Publisher: Simon & Schuster
- Publication date: May 17, 2021
- Publication place: United States
- Pages: 147
- ISBN: 9781982153410
- Dewey Decimal: 323.440973
- Preceded by: Tribe

Freedom is a creative nonfiction book written by Sebastian Junger and published by Simon & Schuster in 2021.

This 2021 travel memoir is an extended meditation on "what it means to be free." In the book, which recounts the experiences of two Afghanistan combat vets, a photojournalist, and war reporter, and a black dog named Daisy walking 400 miles along railway lines in south-central Pennsylvania, Junger argues that modern civilization has not made people feel safer or contented in their lives, and the weakening of interpersonal bonds have contributed to a rise of anxiety, depression, and suicide, especially among the wealthiest societies. The main theme from Junger's earlier books, "extolling the superiority, both moral and psychological, of life in small nomadic groups (or small embattled platoons) over modernity under capitalism — appears repeatedly."

The book was drawn from the experience of the hikes taken during the filming of The Last Patrol, a documentary that included US Army Sgt. Brendan O'Byrne, who appeared in the film Restrepo, US Army soldier David Roels, and Spanish photo-journalist Guillermo Cervera.

== Reception ==
Sarah Sicard, writing in the Military Times, said that "Junger contemplates the intersection of autonomy and coterie at a time when the word itself while holding so much meaning, is so often misunderstood."
