= Apple Grove, West Virginia =

Apple Grove, West Virginia may refer to:

- Apple Grove, Mason County, West Virginia
- Apple Grove, McDowell County, West Virginia
