= Tribe (Junger book) =

2016 book by Sebastian Junger

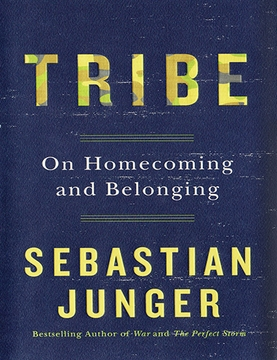
- Author: Sebastian Junger
- Language: English
- Subject: Anthropology, Philosophy
- Genre: Creative nonfiction
- Publisher: Twelve
- Publication date: May 24, 2016
- Publication place: United States
- Pages: 192
- ISBN: 978-0008168216
- Preceded by: War
- Followed by: Freedom

Tribe is a creative nonfiction book written by Sebastian Junger and published by Simon & Schuster in 2016. Junger discusses the reintegration of soldiers into society and the paradoxical observation that adversity and danger can contribute to greater psychological wellbeing. The book received generally positive reviews from critics.

== Contents ==
In Tribe, Junger discusses how the human experience is profoundly different in modern society compared to in the small groups (or tribes) in which people have historically lived. While people in tribes were interconnected and dependent on each other, people in modern society, he argues, often feel detached from their neighbors and experience deep fissures along sociodemographic lines. The modern man may go his whole life without needing to put himself at risk to help other people, given the availability of the police, fire department, and other emergency services; despite being surrounded by people, the modern person may also feel incredibly alone and isolated. These observations give rise a central question of Junger’s book: why do veterans often express that they were happier in times of war than at home?

Junger argues that the platoons in war give a sense of deep connectedness and comradery, things that do not generally exist to the same extent outside of the military. He also argues that times of danger and urgency can make people feel needed and give them purpose. In support of this argument, the book cites several instances of people coming together during adversity, including during the Blitz during World War II. Junger writes: "Adversity often leads people to depend more on one another, and that closeness can produce a kind of nostalgia for the hard times that even civilians are susceptible to". (Note: Junger pg. 92)

== Reception ==
Jennifer Senior, writing in The New York Times, called Tribe one of the "most intriguing political books" of the election year, "all without mentioning a single candidate, or even the president, by name." Joanna Bourke of The Guardian praised Junger's insight into the reasons underlying post traumatic stress disorder in soldiers, while she criticized the book's argument that adversity leads to social cohesion as "deeply unsatisfactory". Bourke writes: "For much of the world’s population, something dangerous is happening all the time. And it doesn’t inevitably lead to solidarity. Indeed, quite the opposite".
