= Avondale, West Virginia =

Avondale is the name of several communities in the U.S. state of West Virginia.

- Avondale, Doddridge County, West Virginia
- Avondale, McDowell County, West Virginia
