= Vallscreek, West Virginia =

Unincorporated community in West Virginia, US

Vallscreek
- Unincorporated community
- Location within West Virginia Vallscreek (the United States)
- Coordinates: 37°13′55″N 81°38′42″W
- Country: United States
- State: West Virginia
- County: McDowell
- Elevation: 1,598 ft (487 m)
- Time zone: UTC-5 (Eastern (EST))
  - Summer (DST): UTC-4 (EDT)
- Zip codes: 24890
- Area codes: 304 & 681
- GNIS feature ID: 1555874

Vallscreek, also previously known as Hartwell, is an unincorporated community in McDowell County, West Virginia, United States. Vallscreek is 5.5 miles (8.9 km) south-southeast of War.

The community takes its name from nearby Vall Creek. The town is on the Norfolk Southern Railway (former Norfolk and Western) network.
