= Excelsior, McDowell County, West Virginia =

Excelsior
- Community
- Location within the state of West Virginia
- Coordinates: 37°18′34″N 81°41′38″W
- Country: United States
- State: West Virginia
- County: McDowell
- Time zone: UTC-5 (Eastern (EST))
  - Summer (DST): UTC-4 (EDT)

Excelsior is a community incorporated within the city of War in McDowell County, West Virginia. Excelsior is located along Dry Fork to the north of the city along West Virginia Route 16. The community was named after the Excelsior Pocahontas Coal Company. The Norfolk and Western Railway had a siding built from 1910—1913 and was removed in 1942.
