= Rift, West Virginia =

Rift
- Unincorporated community
- Location within West Virginia Rift (the United States)
- Coordinates: 37°17′05″N 81°40′18″W
- Country: United States
- State: West Virginia
- County: McDowell
- Elevation: 1,512 ft (461 m)
- Time zone: UTC-5 (Eastern (EST))
  - Summer (DST): UTC-4 (EDT)
- Area codes: 304 & 681
- GNIS feature ID: 1555482

Rift is an unincorporated community in McDowell County, West Virginia, United States. It is located along West Virginia Route 16, 1.5 miles (2.4 km) southeast of War.
