= Daniela Petrova =

American writer

- Born: Sofia, Bulgaria
- Education: Columbia University (BA); New York University (MA)
- Occupation: Writer
- Website: www.danielapetrova.com

Daniela Petrova is a Bulgaria-born American writer, living in New York City. Her debut novel is Her Daughter's Mother (2019).

== Early life and education ==
Petrova was born and raised in Sofia, Bulgaria. Soon after the fall of communism, she moved to New York City.

She earned a BA in Philosophy from Columbia University and an MA in Counseling for Mental Health and Wellness from New York University.

== Her Daughter's Mother ==
Her Daughter's Mother is, according to Randle Browning writing in the Los Angeles Review of Books, a "psychological thriller, part murder mystery", "a deep dive into the oft-underrepresented world of infertility, pregnancy, and motherhood"—"from fertility treatments to egg donation to surrogacy to adoption"—"including all the medical, legal, and emotional obstacles women face".

== Personal life ==
Between at least 2011 and 2014, Petrova was married to American author, journalist and filmmaker Sebastian Junger.

== Publications ==
- Her Daughter's Mother. New York City: Putnam, 2019. ISBN 978-0525539971.
