= Wars (disambiguation) =

A war is a large-scale armed conflict and the term is used as a metaphor for non-military conflicts.

Wars or WARS may also refer to:

- WARS Trading Card Game by Decipher
- Wars (series), a Nintendo video game series
- The Wars, a 1977 novel by Timothy Findley
  - The Wars (film), a 1983 Canadian historical drama film based on the 1977 novel by Timothy Findley
- Wars, a legendary character from the myth of founding of the city of Warsaw; see Wars and Sawa
- West Antarctic Rift System (WARS), a tectonic rift zone

== See also ==
- War (disambiguation)
