= Garland, West Virginia =

Unincorporated community in West Virginia, United States

Garland
- Unincorporated community
- Location within West Virginia Garland (the United States)
- Coordinates: 37°24′02″N 81°47′04″W
- Country: United States
- State: West Virginia
- County: McDowell
- Elevation: 1,066 ft (325 m)
- Time zone: UTC-5 (Eastern (EST))
  - Summer (DST): UTC-4 (EDT)
- Area codes: 304 & 681
- GNIS feature ID: 1554532

Garland is an unincorporated community in McDowell County, West Virginia, United States. Garland is located near West Virginia Route 80, 3.5 miles (5.6 km) north-northeast of Bradshaw.

The town is on the Norfolk Southern Railway (former Norfolk and Western) network and the Dry Branch of the Tug Fork river.
