= Union City, West Virginia =

Union City
- Unincorporated community
- Location within West Virginia Union City (the United States)
- Coordinates: 37°25′50″N 81°47′47″W
- Country: United States
- State: West Virginia
- County: McDowell
- Elevation: 1,004 ft (306 m)
- Time zone: UTC-5 (Eastern (EST))
  - Summer (DST): UTC-4 (EDT)
- Area codes: 304 & 681
- GNIS feature ID: 1555851

Union City is an unincorporated community in McDowell County, West Virginia, United States. Union City is located on the Dry Fork and West Virginia Route 80, 2.5 miles (4.0 km) south-southeast of Iaeger.
