= In My Time of Dying (book) =

2024 book by Sebastian Junger

- Author: Sebastian Junger
- Language: English
- Subject: Near-death experience
- Genre: Nonfiction
- Publisher: Simon & Schuster
- Publication date: May 2024
- Publication place: United States
- Media type: Print
- Pages: 176
- ISBN: 9781668050835
- OCLC: 1433096488

In My Time of Dying: How I Came Face to Face with the Idea of an Afterlife is a nonfiction book by Sebastian Junger that was first published by Simon & Schuster in May 2024. The books relates Junger's near death experience during surgery for an abdominal hemorrhage. While on the operating table, Junger saw a reassuring vision of his father, and afterwards, he reflected on his brush with death and the possibility of an afterlife. The book received positive reviews from critics for its vivid recounting of the medical emergency and for its exploration of existential questions.

== Background ==
Sebastian Junger is a journalist and filmmaker, with experience as a wartime correspondent in the Middle East. At the time of the near death experience described in the book, Junger was living with his wife and two daughters on a remote property in Truro, Massachusetts, after relocating from New York City during the COVID-19 pandemic. In an interview with Boston Magazine, he talked about the challenge of writing about such a profound and harrowing experience.

"It was incredibly traumatic. I waited a couple of years. I couldn’t have written about it immediately afterward. Writing about the medical stuff was weirdly fascinating and not that upsetting. What was hard was writing about the psychological consequences, which were pretty debilitating... but I love the process of writing so much. When I find the perfect words to capture something, there’s such an intoxication that it sort of overrides my discomfort."

== Synopsis ==
In June 2020, Junger was at home with his family when he felt a "sudden burning" below his sternum, incapacitating him with pain. (Note: Junger pg. 13) When paramedics arrived, Junger almost decided not to go to the hospital after feeling a moment of respite from the pain. He later learned that he was in compensatory shock, which was masking the symptoms of severe blood loss. At the hospital, doctors recognized Junger's dire situation, and they determined that he required surgery to stem an abdominal hemorrhage. During surgery, Junger saw his father floating above him and offering a reassuring presence. Junger later reflected: "He was not so much a vision as a mass of energy configured in a deeply familiar way as my father". (Note: Junger pg. 41) The medical team gave Junger ten units of blood, and the surgery to stop the hemorrhage was successful, despite the low probability of survival.

After recovering, Junger sought to understand his near death experience. He thought of all the details that could have resulted in his death, such as if the ambulance had not been able to reach him, and he grapples with whether the vision of his father was a result of hormones and chemicals released by the brain or something else. Junger, whose father was a physicist, also contemplates the possibility of an afterlife from the perspective of physics. While researching the afterlife, the ambiguity in quantum mechanics leads him to several metaphysical questions. Junger writes: "Our understanding of reality might be as limited as a dog’s understanding of television". (Note: Junger pg. 118)

The book also contains several interludes from the medical drama of his near death experience. In these interludes, Junger reflects on death by discussing his time in combat zones and the death of one of his colleagues, Tim Hetherington. During an interview with The New York Times, Junger was asked what he hoped readers would take away from the book. Junger responded: "Every once in a while I write something that allows people to navigate a little bit better. Maybe this book will bring some comfort".

== Critical reception ==
Tara Isabella Burton positively reviewed the book for The Wall Street Journal, writing that the "memoir fills us with awe, and more than a little terror". Burton liked Junger's "visceral" description of the surgery, and how his narrative makes readers contemplate their own mortality. Simon Usborne of The Guardian wrote: "Some of the subatomic stuff is inevitably harder to digest than the hospital drama, but it remains compelling in Junger’s hands."
