= Yukon, West Virginia =

Yukon
- Unincorporated community
- Location within the state of West Virginia Yukon (the United States)
- Coordinates: 37°19′9″N 81°41′46″W
- Country: United States
- State: West Virginia
- County: McDowell
- Time zone: UTC-5 (Eastern (EST))
  - Summer (DST): UTC-4 (EDT)
- ZIP codes: 24899
- GNIS feature ID: 1549474

Yukon, also previously known as Susanna and Watson according to the Geographic Names Information System, is an unincorporated community in McDowell County, West Virginia, United States. It lies at the intersection of West Virginia State Routes 16 and 83.

Yukon is on the Norfolk Southern Railway (former Norfolk and Western) network and the Dry Fork (Tug Fork tributary) river.
