= Atwell, West Virginia =

Unincorporated community in West Virginia, United States

Atwell
- Unincorporated community
- Location within the state of West Virginia Atwell (the United States)
- Coordinates: 37°20′57″N 81°45′45″W
- Country: United States
- State: West Virginia
- County: McDowell
- Time zone: UTC-5 (Eastern (EST))
  - Summer (DST): UTC-4 (EDT)
- GNIS feature ID: 1553762

Atwell is an unincorporated community located in McDowell County, West Virginia, United States. Atwell lies along the Norfolk and Western Railroad on the Dry Fork.
