= Warr (surname) =

Warr is a surname, and may refer to:

== People ==
- Alexis Warr, American dancer
- Antony Warr (1913–1995), English rugby union player
- Augustus Frederick Warr (1847–1908), English lawyer and Conservative party politician
- Charles Warr (1892–1969), Church of Scotland minister and author
- Danny Warr (1905–1972), Australian rules footballer
- John Warr (1927–2016), English cricketer
- Kirrilee Warr, Australian politician
- Peter Warr (1938–2010), English businessman, racing driver
- Simon Warr (1953–2020), Welsh television personality, BBC radio broadcaster, writer and former teacher
- Steve Warr (born 1950s), British television director and producer
- Steve Warr (ice hockey) (born 1951), Canadian professional ice hockey player

== See also ==
- Earl De La Warr
- Warre

=== Warr as a word ===
- Warr (disambiguation)
