= War (Junger book) =

2010 book by Sebastian Junger

War: As Soldiers Really Live It
- Author: Sebastian Junger
- Language: English
- Subject: Afghan War, Campaigns, Afghanistan, Korengal Valley, United States, Army, 173rd Airborne Brigade
- Genre: Creative nonfiction
- Publisher: Twelve
- Publication date: May 11, 2010
- Publication place: United States
- Pages: xi, 287
- ISBN: 978-0-446-55624-8
- Dewey Decimal: 958.1047
- Preceded by: Fire
- Followed by: Tribe

War: As Soldiers Really Live It is a creative nonfiction book written by Sebastian Junger and published by W. W. Norton & Company in 2010.

Accompanied by photojournalist Tim Hetherington, Junger spent months embedded with second platoon of Battle Company, part of the 173rd Airborne Brigade, in the Korengal Valley, a transit corridor for Taliban fighters coming into Afghanistan from Pakistan, between 2007 and 2008. Junger experienced the conditions of the infantry soldier first-hand, witnessing daily firefights and surviving an IED attack on Humvee while on patrol.

Junger profiles multiple soldiers, including Staff Sergent Sal Giunta. His actions during the fighting in the Korengal Valley made him the first soldier to still be alive when receiving the Medal of Honor since the Vietnam War.

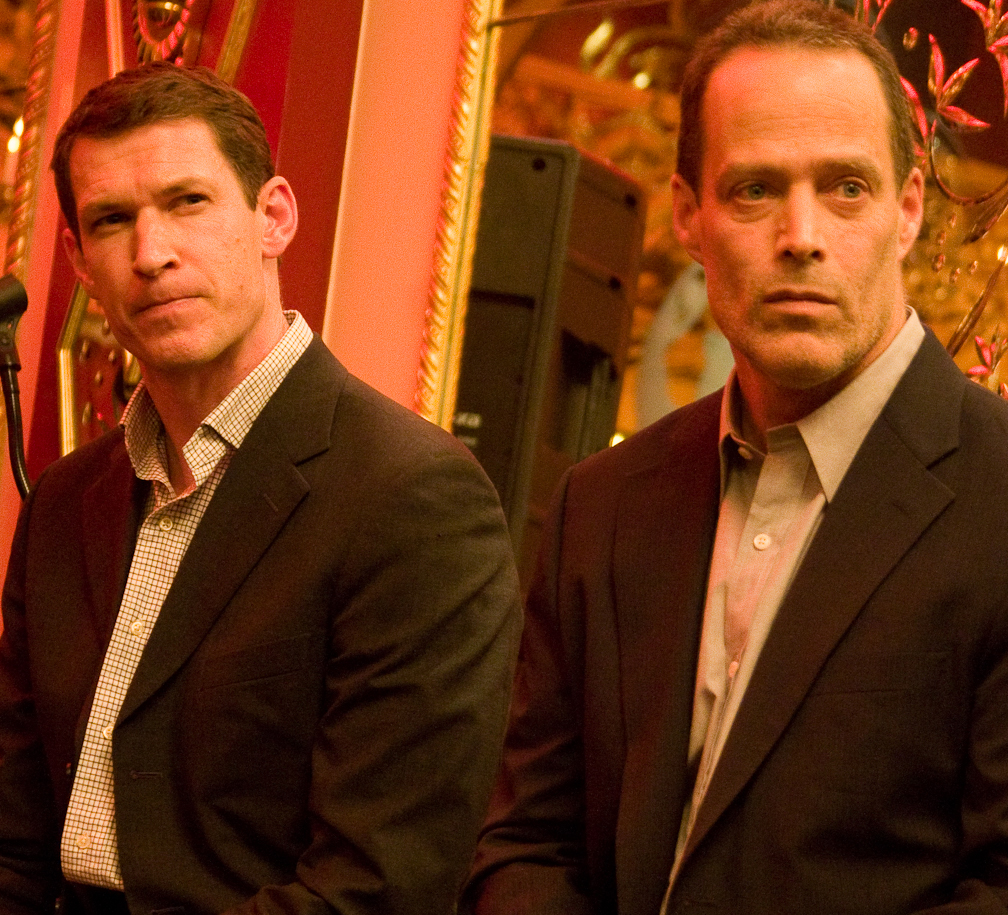
Junger with Tim Hetherington in 2011.

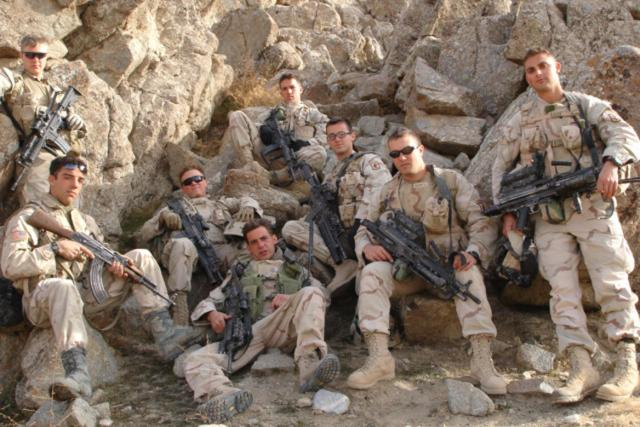
The 173rd Airborne Brigade.

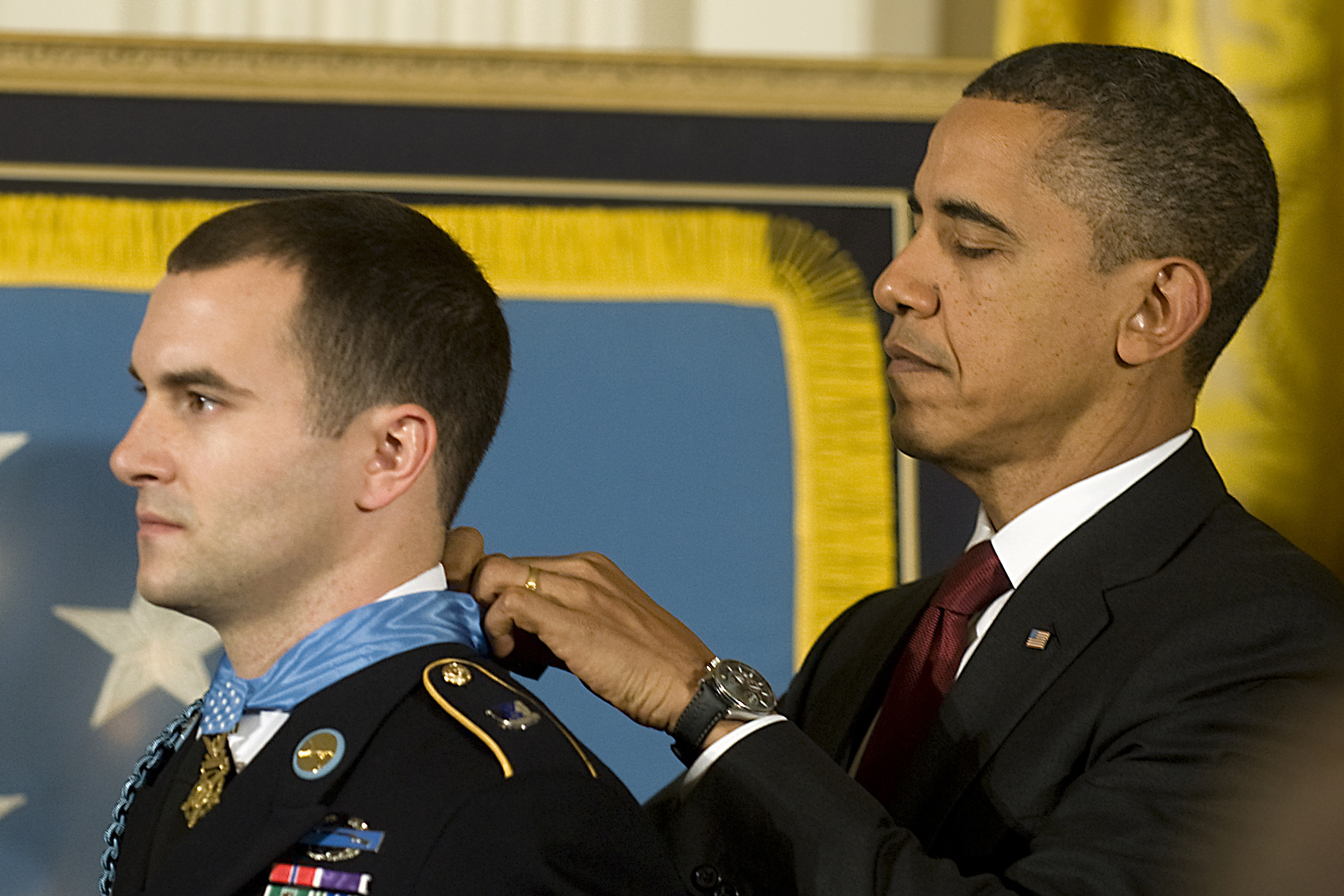
Medal of honor recipient Sgt. Salvatore Giunta and President Barack Obama.

== In Other Media ==
Portions of the book originally appeared as dispatches for Vanity Fair. The documentary film Restrepo, produced and directed by Junger and Hetherington about the soldier’s experience at Combat Outpost (COP) Korengal, was nominated for the 2011 Academy Award for Best Documentary.

== Reception ==
Dexter Filkins writing in the New York Times said that "Junger has found a novel and interesting lens through which to view the conflict in Afghanistan, and he captures many things a lesser writer might miss." "I have never read a more compelling account of the complex suffering and rewards of the combat experience," wrote Antanas Sileika in the Globe and Mail.

Time magazine named War a "Top Ten Non-fiction Book" of 2010.
