= Warriormine, West Virginia =

Warriormine
- Unincorporated community
- Location within the state of West Virginia
- Coordinates: 37°17′34″N 81°41′49″W
- Country: United States
- State: West Virginia
- County: McDowell
- Elevation: 1,407 ft (429 m)
- Time zone: UTC-5 (Eastern (EST))
  - Summer (DST): UTC-4 (EDT)
- ZIP code: 24894
- Area codes: 304 & 681
- GNIS feature ID: 1555921

Warriormine is an unincorporated community located in McDowell County, West Virginia, United States. Warriormine has its own post office with ZIP code 24894.

The community most likely was both named for nearby War Creek and Mine Tunnel.
