= Sebastian Junger =

American author, journalist and filmmaker (born 1962)

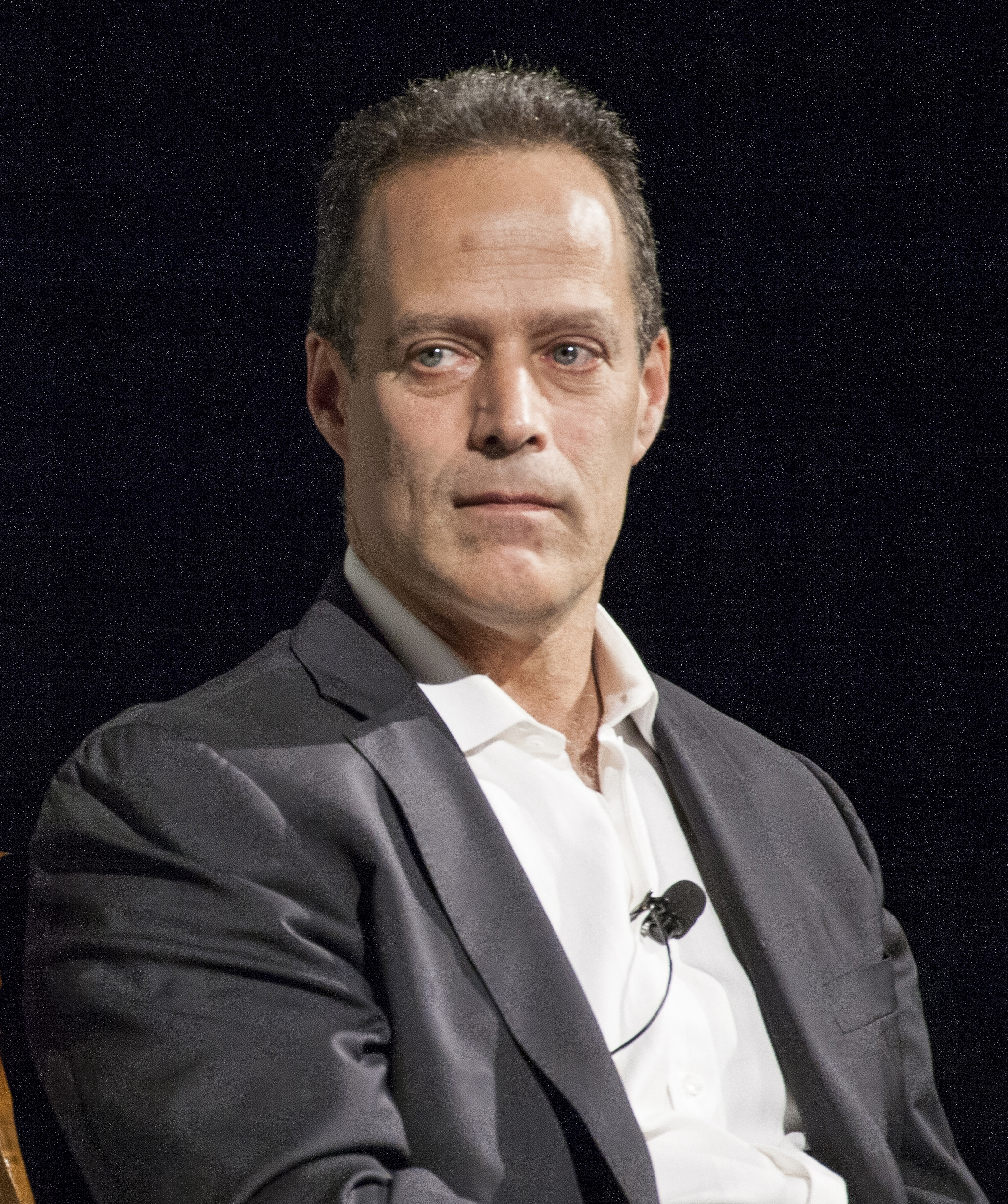
- Junger in April 2013
- Born: January 17, 1962 (age 64); Belmont, Massachusetts, U.S.
- Education: Wesleyan University
- Occupations: Author, journalist and documentary filmmaker
- Writing career
- Language: English
- Website: SebastianJunger.com

Sebastian Junger (born January 17, 1962) is an American journalist, author and filmmaker.

He is the author of The Perfect Storm: A True Story of Men Against the Sea (1997). He covered the War in Afghanistan for more than a decade The book War (2010) was drawn from his field reporting for Vanity Fair, that also served as the background for the documentary film Restrepo (2010).

== Background ==
Junger was born in Belmont, Massachusetts, the son of Ellen Sinclair, a painter, and Miguel Chapero Junger, a physicist. Born in Dresden, Germany, and of Russian, Austrian, Spanish, Italian, and Jewish descent, his father immigrated to the United States during World War II to escape persecution because of paternal Jewish ancestry, and to study engineering at MIT. Junger grew up in the Belmont neighborhood, which he learned was the territory of the Boston Strangler. He was later inspired to write A Death in Belmont (2006).

Junger graduated from Concord Academy in 1980 and received a Bachelor of Arts degree from Wesleyan University in cultural anthropology in 1984. As an accomplished long-distance runner, he spent a summer training on the Navajo Nation reservation and wrote his thesis on Navajo long-distance running and its traditional, pre-Columbian roots.

== Career ==
Junger began working as a freelance writer, often trying to publish articles on topics that interested him.

In 1997, Junger published The Perfect Storm, which was commercially successful.

In 2000 Junger published an article "The Forensics of War," in Vanity Fair. He continues to work there as a contributing editor. In early 2007, he reported from Nigeria on the subject of blood oil. With British photographer Tim Hetherington, Junger created The Other War: Afghanistan, produced with ABC News and Vanity Fair. It was shown on Nightline in September 2008 and the two men shared the DuPont-Columbia Award for broadcast journalism for the work.

His book War (2010) revolves around a platoon of the US Army 173rd Airborne stationed in Afghanistan.

Junger, along with Hetherington, used material gathered in the Korengal Valley of Afghanistan for the book and to create a related documentary feature Restrepo. The film was nominated for an Academy Award for Best Documentary Feature and won the Grand Jury Prize for a domestic documentary at the Sundance Film Festival in 2010.

Junger's book, Tribe: On Homecoming and Belonging, was published in 2016.

His latest work Freedom, on the American ideal of the same name, was published by Simon & Schuster in 2021.

In July 2026, 60 Minutes executive producer Nick Bilton announced in an employee memo that Junger would be joining the broadcast as a contributor.

== Personal life ==
Junger lives in New York City and Cape Cod with his wife and their two children. His first daughter was born in 2016 when he was age 55. Previously, Junger was married to writer Daniela Petrova. They divorced in 2014. He is an atheist.

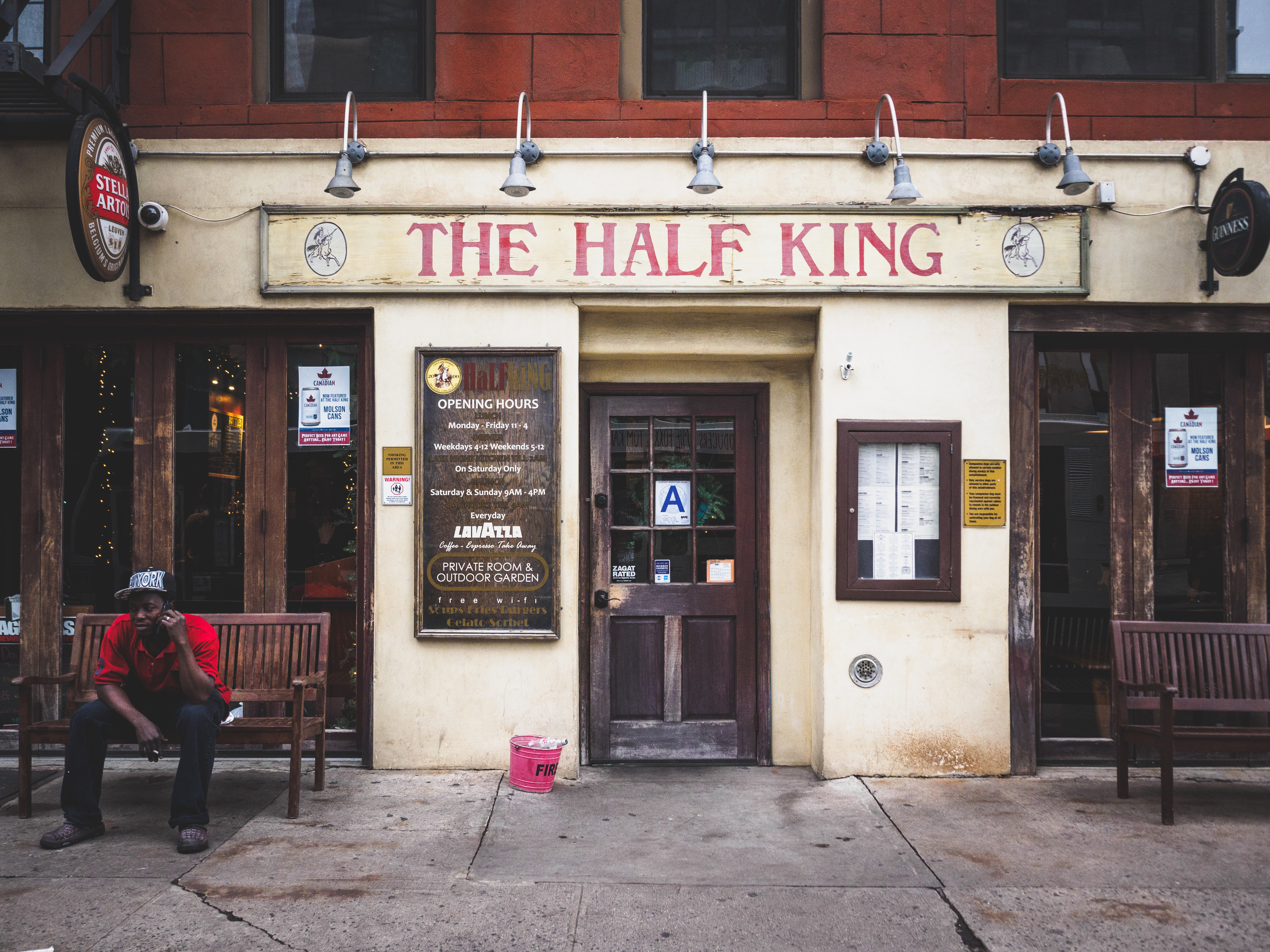
The Half King Bar

Junger co-owned a bar in New York City called the Half King. Named after a Seneca warrior who played colonial forces against each other in the Seven Years War, the bar hosted in-house readings and photo exhibits and was favored by war correspondents and conflict photographers. Rising rents made the business unsustainable, and the Half King closed in 2019 after 19 years of operation.

In June 2020, Junger had a near-death experience when his pancreatic artery ruptured while he was at home in Truro, Massachusetts. He has written a book about the experience, titled In My Time of Dying: How I Came Face to Face with the Idea of an Afterlife.

== Notable work ==
=== The Perfect Storm ===
Junger's book The Perfect Storm: A True Story of Men Against the Sea (1997) recounts a storm in October 1991 that resulted in the Gloucester fishing boat Andrea Gail going down off the coast of Nova Scotia, and the loss of all six crew members: Billy Tyne, Bobby Shatford, Alfred Pierre, David Sullivan, Michael Moran and Dale Murphy.

In 2000, the book was adapted by Warner Brothers as a film of the same name, starring George Clooney and Mark Wahlberg. Junger established The Perfect Storm Foundation to provide cultural and educational grants to children across the country whose parents make their living in the commercial fishing industry.

=== A Death in Belmont ===
A Death in Belmont centers on the 1963 rape and murder of Bessie Goldberg. This was during the period from 1962 to 1964 of the infamous Boston Strangler crimes. Junger received the 2007 PEN/Winship award for the book. Junger raises the possibility in his book that the real Strangler was Albert DeSalvo. He eventually confessed to committing several Strangler murders, but not Goldberg's. Roy Smith, an African-American man, was convicted in her death based on circumstantial evidence. Junger draws no conclusions about the guilt or innocence of either Smith or DeSalvo. Goldberg's daughter has vigorously disputed Junger's suggestion that Smith may have been innocent. Defense attorney Alan Dershowitz said in his review of the book: It "must be read with the appropriate caution that should surround any work of nonfiction in which the author is seeking a literary or dramatic payoff." He noted that Junger did not include endnotes or footnotes, and suggested he may have had too much interest in "playing down coincidences and emphasizing connections."

=== Fire ===
Fire is a collection of articles about dangerous regions or dangerous occupations. In the chapter "Lion in Winter", Junger interviews Ahmad Shah Massoud, leader of the Afghan Northern Alliance. Junger was one of the last Western journalists to interview Massoud in depth. Much of this was first published in March 2001 for National Geographic Adventure, along with photographs by Iranian photographer Reza Deghati and video by cinematographer Stephen Cocklin. Massoud was assassinated on September 9, 2001. Fire also details the conflict diamond trade in Sierra Leone, genocide in Kosovo, and the hazards of fire-fighting in the state of Idaho in the United States.

=== Restrepo ===
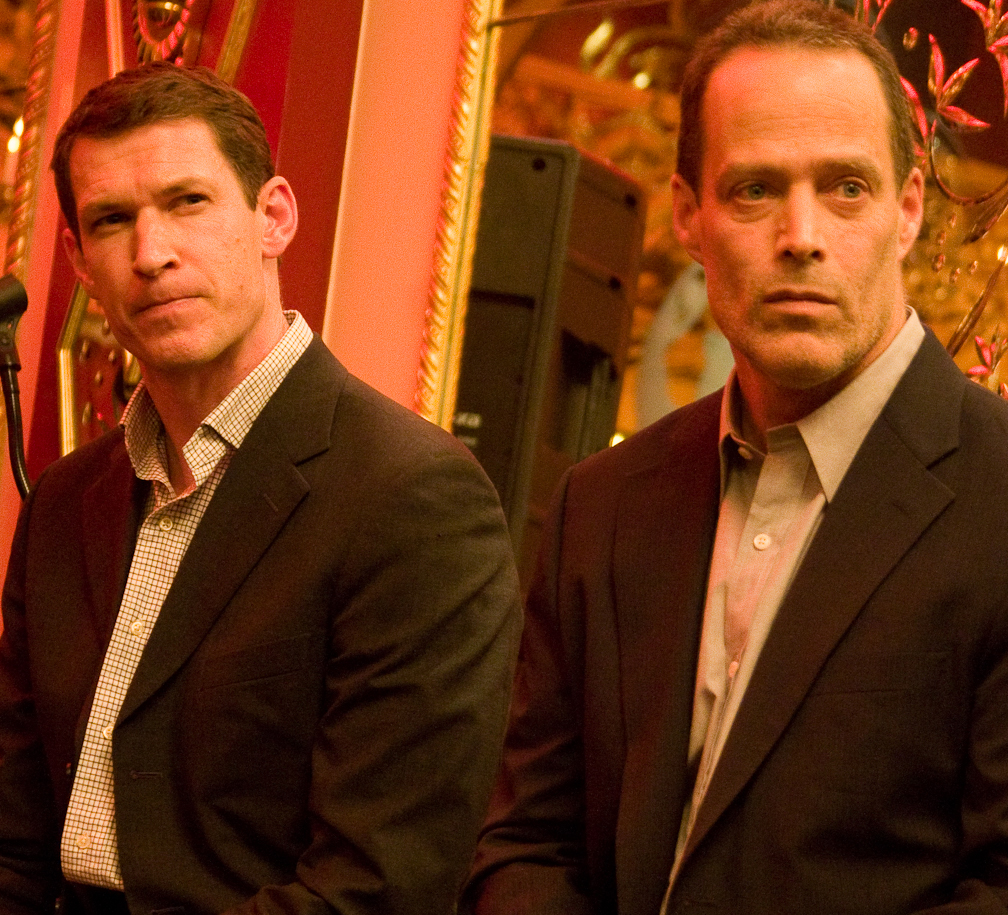
Junger (right) with Tim Hetherington in 2011

In 2009, Junger made his first film, the documentary feature Restrepo, as director with photographer Tim Hetherington. The two worked together in Afghanistan on assignment for Vanity Fair. Junger and Hetherington spent a year with one platoon in the Korengal Valley, which is billed as the deadliest valley in Afghanistan. They recorded video to document their experience, and this footage went on to form the basis for Restrepo. The title refers to the outpost where Junger was embedded, which was named after a combat medic, Pfc. Juan Restrepo, killed in action. As Junger explained, "It's a completely apolitical film. We wanted to give viewers the experience of being in combat with soldiers, and so our cameras never leave their side. There are no interviews with generals; there is no moral or political analysis. It is a purely experiential film." Restrepo, which premiered on the opening night of the 2010 Sundance Film Festival, won the grand jury prize for a domestic documentary. The actor David Hyde Pierce presented the award in Park City, Utah. Junger self-financed the film. Restrepo was nominated for the 2011 Academy Award for Best Documentary.

=== War ===
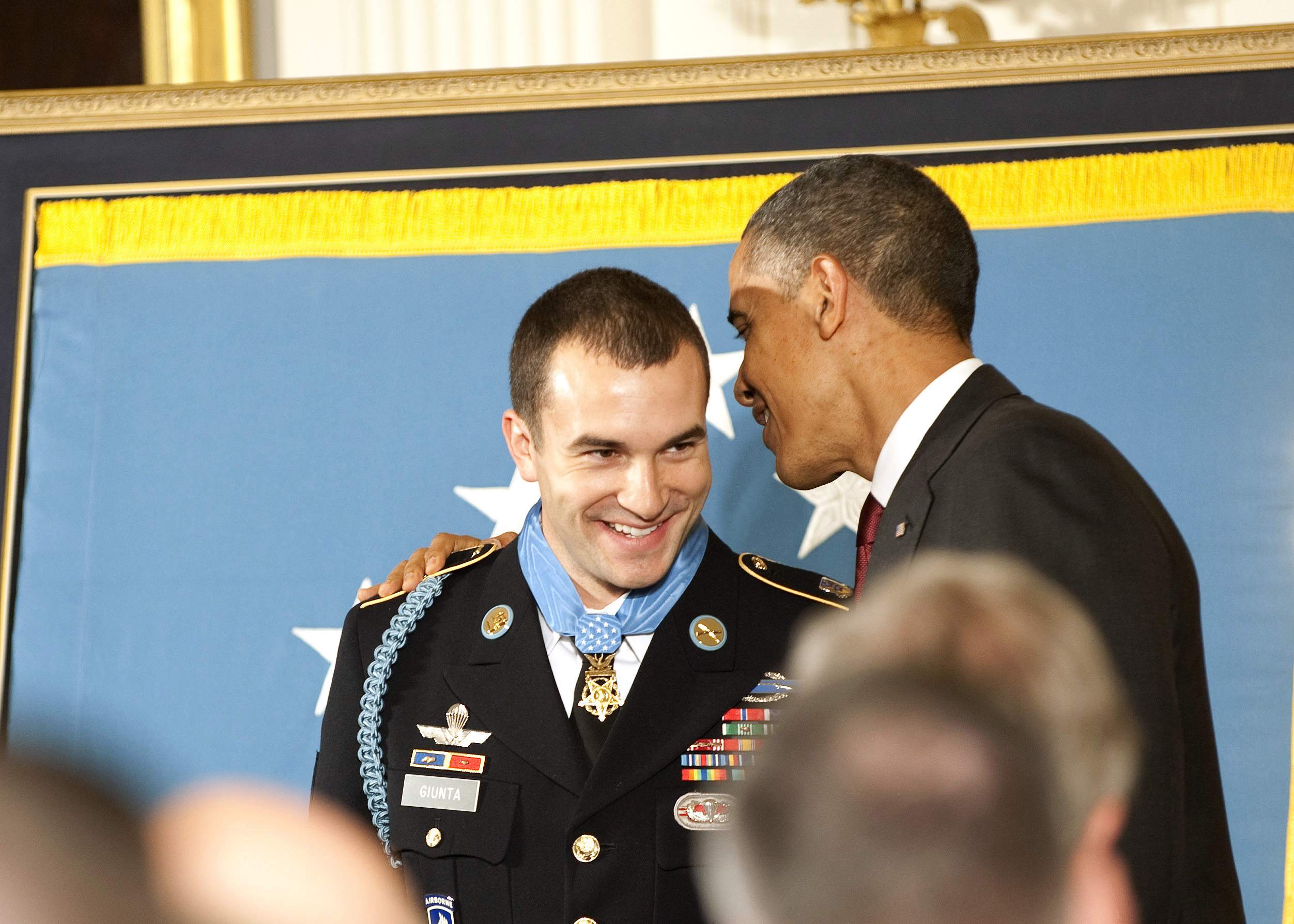
Medal of honor recipient Sgt. Salvatore Giunta beside President Barack Obama

The visits from June 2007 to June 2008 to eastern Afghanistan to the Korengal Valley with Tim Hetherington resulted in Junger's book War (2010), which rewrites and expands upon his Vanity Fair dispatches. Junger in War, tells the story of Staff Sergent Sal Giunta. His actions during the fighting in the Korengal Valley made him the first soldier to still be alive when receiving the Medal of Honor since the Vietnam War. Time magazine named War a "Top Ten Non-fiction Book" of 2010.

=== Which Way Is the Front Line from Here? ===
Junger speaking at the LBJ Library, which screened Which Way Is the Front Line from Here?

In April 2013, Junger's film Which Way Is the Front Line from Here? The Life and Time of Tim Hetherington, debuted at the LBJ Presidential Library. Produced in conjunction with HBO Documentary Films, it documents the life of Hetherington, who was killed in 2011 in Libya.

=== Korengal ===
The 2014 film Korengal continues to follow the soldiers in Battle Company 2/503 during and after their service in the Korengal Valley. The film opened in June 2013 in theaters.

=== The Last Patrol ===
The last of the trilogy about war and its effects on soldiers, this documentary explores "what it means for combat soldiers to reintegrate into daily American life." Junger recruited former US Army Sgt. Brendan O'Byrne, who appeared in the film Restrepo, US Army soldier David Roels, and Spanish photo-journalist Guillermo Cervera to walk the rail corridor between Washington, D.C., Philadelphia, and Pittsburgh. The journey was planned as a tribute to deceased photographer Tim Hetherington. The film premiered at the Margaret Mead Film Festival and aired on HBO in November.

=== Tribe ===
In Tribe (2016) Junger studies war veterans from an anthropological perspective.

=== Freedom ===
This 2021 travel memoir is an extended meditation on "what it means to be free", according to Junger. In the book, which recounts the experiences of two Afghanistan combat vets, a photojournalist and war reporter, and a black dog named Daisy walking 400 miles along railway lines in south-central Pennsylvania.

=== In My Time of Dying ===
In My Time of Dying (2024) recounts Junger's near-death experience due to an abdominal hemorrhage.

== See also ==
- List of American print journalists
