= Cool John Ferguson =

American guitarist and singer-songwriter (1953–2025)

- Born: December 2, 1953; Beaufort, South Carolina, U.S.
- Died: August 12, 2025 (aged 71) Beaufort, South Carolina, U.S.
- Genres: Electric blues
- Occupations: Guitarist, singer, songwriter
- Instrument: Guitar
- Years active: 1970s–2025
- Website: Official website

John W. Ferguson (December 2, 1953 – August 12, 2025), known professionally as Cool John Ferguson, was an American blues guitarist, singer and songwriter. He released five albums under his own name and played on around 20 others. He was the Director of Creative Development for the Music Maker Relief Foundation, and played his guitar "upside down".

Taj Mahal stated that Ferguson ranked "among the five greatest guitarists in the world. He is a force to be reckoned with in the music industry. He is with the ranks of Jimi Hendrix, Wes Montgomery, and Django Reinhardt." At various times, Ferguson played the guitar backing for Taj Mahal, B. B. King, Kenny "Blues Boss" Wayne, Beverly Watkins and the Stylistics.

== Life and career ==
Ferguson was born in Beaufort, South Carolina, United States on December 3, 1953. His father, John Wesley Ferguson, was head deacon at the Beaufort New Church of Christ, whilst his mother, Martha Jenkins Ferguson, hailed from Saint Helena Island. The connection to Gullah culture remained strong in Ferguson's life. He had learned to play the guitar by the age of three, but "had to be sat in someone's lap while they sat in a chair." He was naturally left handed, and learned to play on a right handed guitar held upside down. Two years later he was playing gospel music as a professional, and became a featured entertainer with his siblings billed as 'Little John and the Ferguson Sisters' on The Lowcountry Sing on Channel 5, a Charleston, South Carolina-based radio station. He expanded his musical knowledge in the early 1960s, by surreptitiously listening to WAPE, "the Big Ape", out of Jacksonville, Florida. At Beaufort High School, Ferguson played the trumpet in a marching band and learned to read music. By 1972, he had joined the Earl Davis Trio. This jazz based beginning led to a five-year stint with Stephen Best and the Soul Crusaders who played across South Carolina. He also played on the tent revival circuit, and recorded with LaFace Records.

To supplement his income from music, Ferguson worked in landscaping and construction as a young man. He relocated to near Durham, North Carolina for a spell, and Ferguson noted that "the local people were, you know, checking me out and saying 'you've got a cool walk,' 'you've got a cool talk.' So they summarized it to Cool John." In addition to supplying studio backing work for various musicians, including Little Pink Anderson and Frank Edwards, Ferguson started to appear under his own name. He toured widely, performing at the Byron Bay Bluesfest, Lincoln Center Out-Of-Doors, Lucerne Blues Festival, Switzerland's Blues to Bop Festival, the Savannah Music Festival, Columbia Blues Festival, and at the Lincoln Center for the Performing Arts. He kept a connection to his roots by having a regular Saturday night engagement at the All People's Grill, a roadhouse situated north of Durham, North Carolina.

At the Penn Center on Saint Helena Island, Ferguson was recruited to join a fledgling Music Maker Relief Foundation. Ferguson worked as Music Maker's Director of Creative Development from the 1990s. In 2003, Ferguson performed at the AmeriServ Johnstown Folkfest. In the early 2000s, he released his albums Guitar Heaven; the seasonal effort, Cool Yule; plus Cool John Ferguson; all issued by Music Maker. In 2007, Ferguson relocated to Atlanta with his wife, where he started his own record label, Cool John Recordings. Ferguson's own With These Hands was the first release for the new label. The album contained 15 original tracks, ten of them incorporating vocals, encompassing blues, R&B, funk, rock and occasional Latin rhythms.

Ferguson was noted by Living Blues magazine for two years running as 'Most Outstanding Guitarist.' His work with Music Maker saw him responsible for scores of albums being recorded by lesser known blues, folk and country artists, many of them at the veteran stage of their careers. He played in a fundraiser for the Foundation in Washington, D.C., with Ironing Board Sam, and was featured in a photographic essay called "Music Makers", which was picked up by Garden & Gun magazine. Ferguson appeared in the documentary film, Toot Blues (2008), about the formation and early days of the Music Maker Relief Foundation.

To mark the occasion of fellow Beaufort native, Joe Frazier's death in 2011, Ferguson played an electric version of "The Star-Spangled Banner" at the Henry C. Chambers Waterfront Park. In addition, Ferguson regularly played in two churches in Atlanta each Sunday.

Often dressed in his trademark flat-brimmed stetson hat, Ferguson continued to play his Fender Stratocaster upside down until his death.

Cool John Ferguson died on August 12, 2025, at the age of 71.

== Discography ==
=== Albums ===
Year	Title	Record label	Credited as
2001	Cool John Ferguson	Music Maker	Cool John Ferguson
2002	Cool Yule	Music Maker	Cool John Ferguson
2003	Guitar Heaven	Music Maker	Cool John Ferguson
2007	With These Hands	Self released	Cool John Ferguson
2015	Live at the Hamilton	Music Maker	Captain Luke & Cool John Ferguson

== See also ==
- List of electric blues musicians
