= Richard Warre =

Richard Warre (c. 1649 – January 1730, Winchester) was an English civil servant. He was under-secretary to a succession of Tory Secretaries of State: Viscount Preston (in 1688), the Earl of Nottingham (from 1689 to 1693 and 1702 to 1704, Robert Harley (from 1704 to 1708) and William Legge, 1st Earl of Dartmouth from 1710 to 1713.
