= Lex, West Virginia =

Lex
- Unincorporated community
- Location within West Virginia Lex (the United States)
- Coordinates: 37°22′13″N 81°48′01″W
- Country: United States
- State: West Virginia
- County: McDowell
- Elevation: 1,135 ft (346 m)
- Time zone: UTC-5 (Eastern (EST))
  - Summer (DST): UTC-4 (EDT)
- Area codes: 304 & 681
- GNIS feature ID: 1554947

Lex is an unincorporated community in McDowell County, West Virginia, United States. Lex is located on West Virginia Route 80, 1.3 miles (2.1 km) north of Bradshaw.

The community was named after Elexious "Lex" Evans, an early postmaster.
