= Bartley, West Virginia =

Bartley
- Census-designated place (CDP)
- Location within the state of West Virginia
- Coordinates: 37°20′26″N 81°44′15″W
- Country: United States
- State: West Virginia
- County: McDowell

Area
  - Total: 1.156 sq mi (2.99 km^{2})
  - Land: 1.142 sq mi (2.96 km^{2})
  - Water: 0.014 sq mi (0.036 km^{2})

Population (2020)
  - Total: 146
  - Density: 128/sq mi (49.4/km^{2})
- Time zone: UTC-5 (Eastern (EST))
  - Summer (DST): UTC-4 (EDT)
- ZIP Codes: 24813
- Area code: 304
- GNIS feature ID: 1553808

Bartley is a census-designated place (CDP) located in McDowell County, West Virginia, United States. It lies along the Norfolk and Western Railroad on the Dry Fork. As of the 2020 census, its population was 146 (down from 224 at the 2010 census). According to the Geographic Names Information System, Bartley has also been known as Bartlett and Peeryville.

== History ==
The community derives its name from Bartley Ross, an original owner of the town site.

=== Mining disaster ===
Bartley was the site of one of the deadliest mine disasters in American history when the Pond Creek #1 mine, owned by the Pocahontas Coal Corporation, exploded on January 10, 1940, at 2:30 PM. Ninety-one miners lost their lives. The west side of the mine was not affected; 37 men escaped injury. Another 10 men at the bottom of the shaft, used to lower the men into the mine, were also unaffected. A rescue effort was mounted; seven hours after the first explosion, while men were working to save their fellow miners, a second explosion occurred, ending the rescue effort for the 91 lost men.

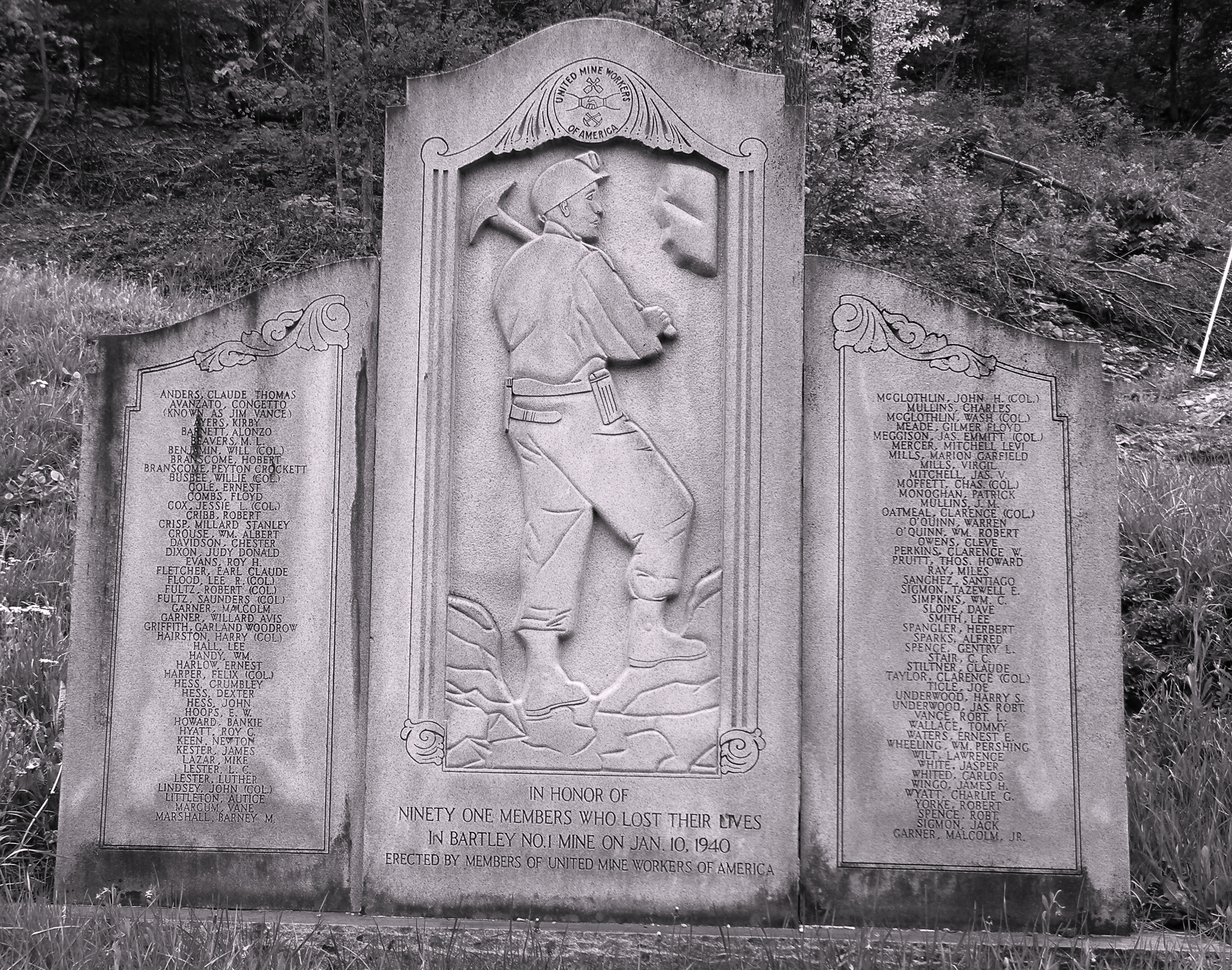

Upon investigation, the cause of the explosion was found to be a gas pocket that had built up during the shift that was touched off by a spark of unknown origin. The mine had had a continuous history of having dangerous gas conditions throughout its existence. The memorial marker to the 91 men can be found at the local United Methodist Church located at Bartley. The explosion left 51 widowed women along with 169 orphaned children.
