= Raysal, West Virginia =

Raysal
- Census-designated place (CDP)
- Location within the state of West Virginia
- Coordinates: 37°20′35″N 81°46′56″W
- Country: United States
- State: West Virginia
- County: McDowell

Area
  - Total: 1.244 sq mi (3.22 km^{2})
  - Land: 1.229 sq mi (3.18 km^{2})
  - Water: 0.015 sq mi (0.039 km^{2})
- Elevation: 1,201 ft (366 m)

Population (2020)
  - Total: 364
  - Density: 296/sq mi (114/km^{2})
- Time zone: UTC-5 (Eastern (EST))
  - Summer (DST): UTC-4 (EDT)
- ZIP code: 24879
- Area codes: 304 & 681
- GNIS feature ID: 1555448

Raysal is a census-designated place (CDP) in McDowell County, West Virginia, United States. Raysal is located along West Virginia Route 83, 1 mile (1.6 km) southeast of Bradshaw. Raysal has a post office with ZIP code 24879. As of the 2020 census, its population was 364 (down from 465 at the 2010 census).

The community's name is an amalgamation of Raymond Salvati, a mining official.

Raysal is on the Norfolk Southern Railway (former Norfolk and Western) network.
