= Little Pink Anderson =

American Piedmont blues singer-guitarist

Alvin "Little Pink" Anderson (born July 13, 1954) is an American Piedmont blues singer-guitarist. Mentored by his father Pink Anderson, he is known for his authentic performing of his father's style of blues and is highly reputed for his electric guitar skills. Anderson committed himself to a full-time music career in the 1990s, recording albums that cover his father's work.

Anderson was born in Spartanburg, South Carolina, United States; he is the son of popular Piedmont blues guitarist Pink Anderson. At an early age, Anderson was encouraged and mentored by his father, who constructed him a miniature guitar, to perform his particular style of blues. "My father was a bigger influence on me than I realized for forty-something years," said Anderson. Father and son began performing together on the medicine show circuit, and at 13 years-old Anderson joined Clarence Carter's band on tour but was forced to leave when Carter discovered how young Anderson was. In the early 1970s, Anderson made a name for himself as an electric and acoustic guitar player on the local blues scene.

However, in 1972, Anderson was arrested for armed robbery; his father, disheartened by his son's imprisonment, died in October 1974 while Anderson was still in jail. He received a parole in 1979, allowing Anderson to resume an intermittent music career, but the death of his son in 1991 and another prison sentence in 1994 temporarily derailed him. Anderson refused parole to give him time to reinvent himself and—reinvigorated by his desire to follow in his father's footsteps—devoted himself to a full-time career in music when Anderson was released in 1996.

Anderson focused more on acoustic guitar, although he was still highly regarded as an amplified guitarist, often performing his father's repertoire at festivals with harmonica player Freddie Vanderford. The pair documented this phase of Anderson's career with a privately distributed cassette tape. He released two further albums, Carolina Bluesman (where he was joined on playing the guitar by Cool John Ferguson) in 2005, and Sittin' Here Singing the Blues, originally issued in 2006 on Music Maker.
