= Warr =

Warr or WARR may refer to:

- Warr Glacier, in Antarctica
- Warr Guitar
- WARR (AM) (1520 AM), radio station in North Carolina, USA
- Warr Acres, Oklahoma, a city in Oklahoma County, Oklahoma, United States
- WARR (TUM), a student group at the Technical University of Munich
- Warr (surname)
- Juanda International Airport (ICAO code WARR), in Sedati, Sidoarjo Regency, Indonesia
