= War (short story) =

1918 short story by Luigi Pirandello

- Short story by Luigi Pirandello
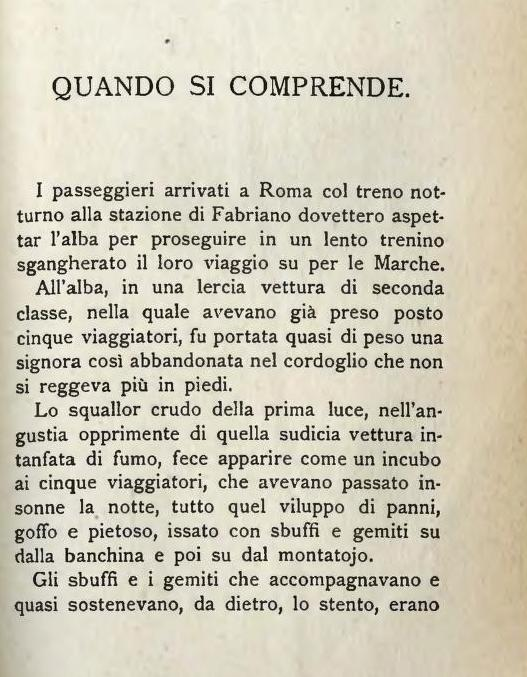
- Title page of the first publication of the story in the short story collection Un Cavallo nella Luna
- Original title: Quando si comprende
- Country: Italy
- Language: Italian
- Genre: Drama

Publication
- Publisher: Fratelli Treves
- Media type: Short story
- Publication date: 1918
- Pages: 11

"War" (Italian: Quando si comprende) is a short story by Italian playwright and dramatist Luigi Pirandello first published in the short story collection Un Cavallo nella Luna in 1918. The story follows a discussion between parents of soldiers in the First World War about how they deal with grief. The story covers topics of patriotism, grief, and the destructive nature of war. It is regarded by some as one of the greatest short stories of the interwar period, along with Jean-Paul Sartre's The Wall. The English translation of the story has since become a frequently taught piece of literature in the United States, Canada, and Germany.

== Plot ==
The plot starts with a mother and father stepping onto a train to leave Rome to visit their only son, who had previously left for deployment in the First World War. The wife is inconsolable in grief and begins to weep, upon this the other passengers ask the husband what is wrong, to which he tells them that their only son had just been deployed. Many of the passengers relate to this, and a woman tells them that her son, who had deployed at the start of war, came home injured two times only to be sent back. Another woman tells them that both of her sons are fighting. They then debate on whether having your only son sent to war is better or worse than having two of you sons sent off. With the husband saying that if one of your sons dies, you still have the other one. But another passenger argues that having a remaining son means that the father would have to continue living through his grief and suffering. They are then interrupted by another passenger, described by Pirandello as fat and red-faced, who calls the conversation "nonsense", saying that their children belong to their country and do not exist for their own sake. He explains that his son has already died in the war, but that his son had sent a message to him saying that in his last moments he was satisfied to have died defending his country, and because of this he does not mourn his death. These silences the other passengers, who seem to be moved by his speech and all agree with his sentiment. The grieving mother too is moved by this and starts to think of how selfish her grieving is. But soon after, she comes to be disillusioned with his argument and asks him a seemingly silly question: "Then, is your son really dead?". The story ends with the fat man through those words coming to the realization that his son was really dead, as he begins to weep uncontrollably to the shock of the other passengers.
