= Avondale, McDowell County, West Virginia =

Unincorporated community in West Virginia, United States

Avondale
- Unincorporated community
- Location within the state of West Virginia Avondale (the United States)
- Coordinates: 37°24′45″N 81°47′3″W
- Country: United States
- State: West Virginia
- County: McDowell
- Elevation: 1,066 ft (325 m)
- Time zone: UTC-5 (Eastern (EST))
  - Summer (DST): UTC-4 (EDT)
- ZIP codes: 24811
- GNIS feature ID: 1553769

Avondale is an unincorporated community located in McDowell County, West Virginia, United States. Avondale lies along the Norfolk and Western Railroad on the Dry Fork. According to the Geographic Names Information System, the community has also been known as Ritter having been named after William McLellan Ritter, founder of the W.M. Ritter company.
