= War (2019 soundtrack) =

- Soundtrack album cover

Soundtrack album by Vishal–Shekhar, Sanchit Balhara and Ankit Balhara
- Released: 27 September 2019
- Recorded: 2018–2019
- Studio: Vishal and Shekhar Studio, Mumbai; YRF Studios, Mumbai; Purple Haze Studio, New Delhi; Mastering World, Wales
- Genre: Feature film soundtrack
- Length: 14:24
- Label: YRF Music
- Producer: Abhijit Nalani
External audio
- Official Audio Jukebox on YouTube

Vishal–Shekhar chronology
Bharat (2019)	War (2019)	Khaali Peeli (2020)

Sanchit Balhara and Ankit Balhara chronology
Malaal (2019)	War (2019)	Panga (2020)

War is the soundtrack to the 2019 Hindi-language action film of the same name directed by Siddharth Anand, starring Hrithik Roshan, Tiger Shroff and Vaani Kapoor. The soundtrack to the film featured two songs composed by Vishal–Shekhar and three instrumental themes from the film score composed by Sanchit Balhara and Ankit Balhara. It was released by YRF Music on 27 September 2019.

== Release ==
War's soundtrack was preceded with the first single "Ghungroo" released on 5 September 2019. It was written by Kumaar, and sung by Arijit Singh and Shilpa Rao. The song was choreographed by Bosco–Caesar and Tushar Kalia, which was shot at the Positano beach in Italy and Amalfi Coast. The second single "Jai Jai Shivshankar" was released on 21 September. The hook of the song is inspired from the eponymous song sung by Kishore Kumar and Lata Mangeshkar from Aap Ki Kasam (1974). It was sung by Vishal Dadlani and Benny Dayal, and choreographed by Bosco–Caesar; set against the backdrop of Holi celebrations, the song featured Roshan and Shroff dancing at the festival. The soundtrack was released by YRF Music on 27 September.

== Track listing ==
=== Hindi ===
No.	Title	Lyrics	Music	Singer(s)	Length
1.	"Ghungroo"	Kumaar	Vishal–Shekhar	Arijit Singh, Shilpa Rao	5:02
2.	"Jai Jai Shivshankar"	Kumaar	Vishal–Shekhar	Vishal Dadlani, Benny Dayal	3:50
3.	"War Theme"	—	Sanchit Balhara, Ankit Balhara	Instrumental	2:00
4.	"Kabir's Theme"	—	Sanchit Balhara, Ankit Balhara	Instrumental	1:39
5.	"Khalid's Theme" (Instrumental)	—	Sanchit Balhara, Ankit Balhara	Vishal Dadlani	1:53
Total length:					14:24

=== Tamil ===
No.	Title	Lyrics	Music	Singer(s)	Length
1.	"Salangaigal"	Madhan Karky	Vishal–Shekhar	Rahul Vaidya, Anusha Mani	5:03
2.	"Jai Jai Shiva Shankara"	Madhan Karky	Vishal–Shekhar	Benny Dayal, Nakash Aziz	3:50
3.	"War Theme"	—	Sanchit Balhara, Ankit Balhara	Instrumental	2:00
4.	"Kabir's Theme"	—	Sanchit Balhara, Ankit Balhara	Instrumental	1:40
5.	"Khalid's Theme" (Instrumental)	—	Sanchit Balhara, Ankit Balhara	Vishal Dadlani	1:54
Total length:					14:27

=== Telugu ===
No.	Title	Lyrics	Music	Singer(s)	Length
1.	"Gunde Lo Thootlu Pade"	Chaitanya Prasad	Vishal–Shekhar	Rahul Vaidya, Anusha Mani	5:03
2.	"Jai Jai Shivshankar"	Chaitanya Prasad	Vishal–Shekhar	Benny Dayal, Nakash Aziz	3:50
3.	"War Theme"	—	Sanchit Balhara, Ankit Balhara	Instrumental	2:00
4.	"Kabir's Theme"	—	Sanchit Balhara, Ankit Balhara	Instrumental	1:39
5.	"Khalid's Theme" (Instrumental)	—	Sanchit Balhara, Ankit Balhara	Vishal Dadlani	1:53
Total length:					14:25

== Reception ==
Debarati S Sen of The Times of India reviewed the song "Jai Jai Shivshankar" and stated that the duo "have woven the feel of unfettered revelry in the soundscape and that comes alive in the dance sequence"; regarding "Ghungroo", she described the song as an "uber-modern twist" of the ghazal number "Ghungroo Toot Gaye" from Param Dharam (1987) and added that "electronic elements have been used generously in the soundscape which give the party track, a lazy yet groovy vibe". Joginder Tuteja of Bollywood Hungama stated that the soundtrack "adds on further punch".

Pratishruti Ganguly from Firstpost described that the songs, are "catchy in their own right, but lack repeat value"; she was more critical of the album's length, adding "Had the album of War offered a longer selection, it probably would have been relatively easier to decide if the soundtrack warrants repeat listens." Anupama Chopra of Film Companion criticised the songs being "force-fitted" and added that "the background music by Sanchit Balhara and Ankit Balhara has more impact than the two songs by Vishal–Shekhar". Swarup Chakravarthy of BollySpice wrote "the album never really gets going and definitely has no flow about it". Nairita Mukherjee of India Today called the music as "strictly passable". Hanna Rachel Abraham of The Week complimented the music as "decent" but "the songs are abruptly placed and add nothing to the story whatsoever except seeing Hrithik Roshan dance again".

== Accolades ==
Award (Note: Awards, festivals and organisations are in Alphabetical order.)	Date of ceremony (Note: Date is linked to the article about the awards held that year, wherever possible.)	Category	Recipient(s)	Result	Ref.
Filmfare Awards	15 February 2020	Best Female Playback Singer	Shilpa Rao ("Ghungroo")	Won	
Filmfare Awards	15 February 2020	Best Choreography	Bosco–Caesar ("Jai Jai Shiv Shankar")	Nominated	
Filmfare Awards	15 February 2020	Best Choreography	Bosco–Caesar & Tushar Kalia ("Ghungroo")	Nominated	
International Indian Film Academy Awards	27–29 November 2020	Best Music Director	Vishal–Shekhar	Nominated	
International Indian Film Academy Awards	27–29 November 2020	Best Male Playback Singer	Arijit Singh ("Ghungroo")	Nominated	
International Indian Film Academy Awards	27–29 November 2020	Best Female Playback Singer	Shilpa Rao ("Ghungroo")	Nominated	
International Indian Film Academy Awards	27–29 November 2020	Sound Mixing	Anuj Mathur – YRF Studios; Pritam Das	Won	
International Indian Film Academy Awards	27–29 November 2020	Best Choreography	Bosco–Caesar & Tushar Kalia ("Ghungroo")	Won	
Mirchi Music Awards	19 February 2020	Song of The Year	"Ghungroo"	Nominated	
Mirchi Music Awards	19 February 2020	Female Vocalist of The Year	Shilpa Rao ("Ghungroo")	Nominated	
Mirchi Music Awards	19 February 2020	Song Engineer – Recording & Mixing	Abhay Rumde & Vijay Dayal ("Ghungroo")	Nominated	
Screen Awards	8 December 2019	Best Choreography	Bosco–Caesar & Tushar Kalia ("Ghungroo")	Won	
Zee Cine Awards	13 March 2020	Best Choreography	Bosco–Caesar ("Jai Jai Shiv Shankar")	Won	
