= Apple Grove, McDowell County, West Virginia =

Unincorporated community in West Virginia, United States

Apple Grove
- Unincorporated community
- Location within the state of West Virginia Apple Grove (the United States)
- Coordinates: 37°26′15″N 81°48′17″W
- Country: United States
- State: West Virginia
- County: McDowell
- Time zone: UTC-5 (Eastern (EST))
  - Summer (DST): UTC-4 (EDT)
- GNIS feature ID: 1549567

Apple Grove is an unincorporated community located in McDowell County, West Virginia, United States. Apple Grove is located along West Virginia Route 80 on the Dry Fork, south of Iaeger.

Apple Grove is on the Norfolk Southern Railway (former Norfolk and Western) network.
