= List of Garo: Yami o Terasu Mono episodes =

This is a list of episodes of the 2013 Japanese tokusatsu television series Garo: Yami o Terasu Mono, the sequel to 2005 & 2006's Garo.

== Episodes ==
No.	Title	Written by	Original release date
1	"Ryuga"; Transliteration: "Ryūga" (Japanese: 流～Ryuga～)	Itaru Era; Makoto Yokoyama	April 5, 2013
Twelve hours earlier, a Makai Knight in a black long coat named Ryuga Dougai arrived to the seemingly peaceful Vol City on orders from higher up. After sneaking past security, Ryuga heads to the park and enjoys the sights before meeting a girl who gave him a handkerchief. Later, Ryuga sees a bride and identifies her as a Horror. Following her to a building in the Karishi district where is to be fitted in her dress, Ryuga confronts the bride as she is forced to run. Despite the bride's attempt to use her wedding reception to protect her, Ryuga forces her out the window and dons the Garo armor to kill her before his feet touch the ground. However, while leaving the Karishi district, Ryuga finds himself surrounded by the city's paramilitary force: the SG1. After eventually escaping the SG1 and its commander Enhou, Ryuga takes a rest and is astonished to find incident not mentioned in the local media. Pondering the reason for the media black out, Ryuga finds himself attacked by the bride's bouquet, the Horror's main form. However, Ryuga is saved when Makai Priest Burai, a man from his past, arrives and has the Horror devoured by his Makai Beast Ragō. As he meets fellow Makai Knights Aguri Kusugami and Takeru Jakuzure, Ryuga learns that Burai is the one who request his presence in Vol City and turns down the Makai Priest's offer to aid him and his group.
2	"Gold wave" Transliteration: "Gōrudo wēbu" (Japanese: 波～Gold wave～)	Itaru Era	April 12, 2013
Masahiko Washizu, a manager of Kaneshiro Real Estate, tries to convince Ishizaki to sell his hotel to his company. But when Ishizaki wants double the arranged payment, Washizu is forced to reveal himself as a Horror and devours Ishizaki's soul. After trapping the souls of the women accompanying Ishizaki in cards, Washizu forges his victim's signature. The next day, finding Ryuga pursued by Enhou and the SG1, Takeru helps him escape. Explaining their name is short for Security Guardian One, Takeru reveals the SG1 are under the employ of the Kaneshiro Group who run Vol City. Brought to Burai's lair, considering his Madogu useless, Ryuga gives Zaruba to the Makai Priest. At Kaneshiro Real Estate, his nature as a Horror confirmed by a Makai Priestess named Rian, Washizu is lured into a trap she and Aguri set up. However, Rian is forced to flee as her attacks have no effect on Washizu. When Burai informed of the situation, he asks Ryuga to help as only he can deal undetectable Horrors that can live easily among humans. Finding his target, Ryuga introduces himself before fighting Washizu as he forced to defend himself with ever slash made on him creating a golden shock wave that overwhelms his opponent. After Washizu assumes his Horror form, Ryuga dons his armor to destroy the Horror while realizing the visions caused by the shock waves are of his past as the Garo armor momentarily regained its golden appearance. Coming to after losing consciousness, Ryuga learns that Washizu was a Madō Horror, a type of Horror unable to be detected by normal means. Recognizing Rian as the girl he met on his first day in Vol City, Ryuga agrees to aid Burai to uncover the mystery of his armor's condition and the secret behind his visions of his mother.
3	"Dungeon"; Transliteration: "Danjon" (Japanese: 迷～Dungeon～)	Kei Taguchi; Makoto Yokoyama	April 19, 2013
Overhearing rumors of a naked woman appearing in Vol City's F4 Entrance, Takeru intends to meet the urban legend. Elsewhile, needing answers about Madō Horrors from her, Ryuga meets Rian as she is spreading magic charms around the city by Aguri's request in relation to the F4 Entrance rumors. By nightfall, Takeru finds the naked woman who is actually a Horror as Ryuga arrives with her escaping as Takeru tries to cover up his reasons for being there. The two proceed to look for the naked woman before running into Aguri as he does not what them to meddle in his hunt prior to being attacked by the naked woman and an identical Horror. After Takeru is dragged off by one of them, shooting an arrow into the portal Takeru was carried through, Aguri reveals the two Horrors are actually aspects of a single large bodied creature that turned the underground system into its personal labyrinth while setting up a barrier so Makai Knights could not summon their armor. Aguri explains that he allowed himself to be trapped so he can place charms in certain locations as part of a plan to destroy the Horror. As Rian and Aguri continue their work, the latter giving two charms and a cloth with Horror blood to distract it, Ryuga finds Takeru as the Horror is about to eat him. Luckily, once Ryuga placed the final charms in position as the moonlight with he and Takeru get the monster in position, Aguri becomes Gai the Sky Bow Knight and fires an arrow into the Horror's mouth to kill it. Later, the three Makai Knights argue over Aguri not trusting them before Burai has the three stop bickering. From there, Burai has them all consider the fact that Horror have devoured a large number of humans to have grown to such a size and that fact is Vol City's darkest point.
4	"Dream"; Transliteration: "Dorīmu" (Japanese: 夢～Dream～)	Hisako Fujihira; Makoto Yokoyama	April 26, 2013
Following another failed attempt to arrest Ryuga, Enhou is informed by her subordinate and boyfriend Yoshitomi that he reserved a place for them to have dinner together but she turns down the offer. Later that night, Enhou finds Rian being harassed by some drunks and helps her drive them off and become friends soon after. Elsewhere, sent to investigate a Horror with Takeru, Ryuga finds the radio that was the Horror's Yin Gate as it already entered a man who was dumping his possessions at the time. The next day, with Rian directing them to the Streak House in Vol City's Central Area, Ryuga and Takeru find the restaurant guarded by SG1 soldiers. Using Takeru as a distraction, Ryuga passes through the SG1 soldiers and finds the Horror attacking Enhou as she is investigating Tousei Kaneshiro, the estranged fourth son of the Kaneshiro family who is a suspect in recent terrorist attacks. The next day, after having a nightmare of being force fed a human soul by a mysterious man and more horrified that it was not a dream, Enhou is confronted by Ryuga as he attempts to convince her that they are both on the same side. Once infiltrating the SG1's base, Ryuga formally introduces himself to Enhou. Though she triggers the SG1's alarm as payback for being slapped by him last night, using it to test him, Enhou allows Ryuga to evade capture and agrees to meet him again.
5	"Nightmare"; Transliteration: "Naitomea" (Japanese: 夢～Nightmare～)	Hisako Fujihira; Makoto Yokoyama	May 3, 2013
After having another horrific nightmare of consuming a human soul, Enhou is approached by Yoshitomi over her fatigue and asks her to take a break from SG1 duty. By that time, after learning that the Horror travels through speakers, Ryuga and Takeru are given a rare Madou artifact they are to throw at the Horror. Some time later, as Rian meets Enhou again, the three Makai Knights find the Horror and manage to throw the artifact at him when he escapes into a motorcycle radio. When some SG1 soldiers appear, Takeru has Ryuga serve as the distraction as he and Aguri continue their pursuit. Later, found by Yoshitomi as they go to her home to spend the night, Enhou is called back to duty and finds Ryuga confronting the Horror as Yoshitomi gets hurt. While Ryuga manages to take their fight to another part of the building to slay the Horror to hinder his escape, hearing the mysterious man's voice, Enhou suddenly transforms into a Madō Horror and devours Yoshitomi's soul. Driving off a confused Ryuga as she vows to kill him to avenge her comrade, Enhou is contacted by the mysterious voice to keep an eye on him.
6	"Rock"; Transliteration: "Rokku" (Japanese: 響～Rock～)	Kei Taguchi	May 10, 2013
Overpowering an overweight Horror, Takeru finds the tables are turned when the Horror hears a rock song that increases his power. But once the music ends, the Horror runs off with Takeru unable to pursue. The next day, as Aguri and Rian take over the hunt to a concert where a youth named Shin is to perform, they find Ryuga sensing a presence similar to Washizu. As Shin plays "Bright Hope", Ryuga finds himself and Aguri dealing with Horrors among the audience acting up. With Ryuga taking the guitar and singing, he manages to stop the Horrors' rave as they take their leave. After the concert ends, getting punched by Shin, Ryuga grabs the scale of Washizu that Shin has been using as a guitar pick. After sensing Shin's feeling through his guitar, Ryuga leaves. Though he gives the scale to Burai to be properly disposed of, Ryuga is shocked to find the priest giving it to Rian to give back to Shin. After requesting them to keep the song playing until the very end, Ryuga joins Aguri, Takeru, and Rian in taking out the Horrors that lured with a speaker connected to Shin's live recording. While the others deal with the small fry, Ryuga slays the overweight Horror. After the live recording, Ryuga arrives and destroys the mainframe to ensure the song will not be played again with Shin fine as he hands Washizu's scale over to the Makai Knight. Destroying the scale, Ryuga is confident that Shin will achieve his dream.
7	"Dining"; Transliteration: "Dainingu" (Japanese: 住～Dining～)	Itaru Era	May 17, 2013
Hideyuki Shiranami, a manager of Vol City's Immigration Bureau, brings Tatsuya Shimada and his wife Nami to a manor in Dream Garden Hills after they are accepted by the city. However, Shiranami lures the couple to the basement where they are devoured by the Horrors lurking there. The next day, Takeru is called by Rian to investigate the Immigration Bureau as he meets Rui Suzaki as her family is waiting for the result of their interview of being accepted into Vol City. When Shiranami appears to inform them that they were approved, Takeru finds his Madō Fire on the man ineffective as he is forced to escape when Rian pulled the fire alarm. As Rian reports to Burai of the turn of events and that they are dealing with a Madō Horror, Takeru meets with Rui to convince her to get her family to leave the city. But she refuses to listen and warns him to stay away from her. The next day, the Suzuki Family are brought to Dream Garden Hills where Takeru and Ryuga make a final attempt to stop them from entering. Once Rui and her family are brought in, Takeru and Ryuga find themselves unable to enter due to a barrier erected around the manor. As the Suzaki family are being taken to the basement, Aguri arrives to break the barrier as the Makai Knights save the family in time. As Rian gets the Suzuki family to safety, while aiding Aguri in killing any that flee the manor, Takeru becomes Zen the Flaming Sword Knight to kill the Horror minions. Fighting Shiranami as he assumes his Horror form, with Zen aiding him, Garo kills the Madō Horror as his armor turn gold again upon the monster's death. Soon after, Rian wipes out the Suzuki family's memories of the events and Takeru has them leave on the impression that they were denied a place in Vol City. However, just as they were at the city limits, the Suzuki family encounter a mysterious man who explains their rejection was a mistake. Finding the Suzuki family's truck the next day, Takeru is devastated that the family were taken by the Horrors. Luckily, as Takeru's hair ornament restored her memory of the events, Rui escaped her family's fate though unconscious by the time Burai found her. As Takeru is relieved that Rui is alright, Burai sees this turn of events as proof that someone is behind the Horror activity in Vol City.
8	"Scoop"; Transliteration: "Sukūpu" (Japanese: 乱～Scoop～)	Itaru Era	May 24, 2013
While in the park, Ryuga finds himself being followed by Yasuto Kazami, a former journalist who wants to know about the Horrors. Though Ryuga tries to steer him away, Kazami reveals that he was forced to watch his wife Misaki being killed by a Horror. Though Rian confirms Kazami's story, Burai reminds Ryuga that it is a Makai Knight's duty not to involve normal humans in their matters. Soon after, upon finding Takeru watching over Rui now that her memories have been altered to have her think she is an orphan, Ryuga meets with Kazami to tell him to stay away. However, he also finds Enhou and Tousei Kaneshiro, with Tousei explaining that the Horrors are somehow all contracted to his father Kensui Kaneshiro. From there, Tousei explains Vol City's history and the mysterious disappearance one thousand people. Though Ryuga is reluctant to involve them, Kazami reveals that the Horror that killed his wife was meant for him because he was doing a story that incriminated the Kaneshiro Group in crimes before Tousei convinces Kazami to stand down. Ryuga thanks them for their concerns, but asks them to not involve themselves further before leaving them, without discovering that Enhou is reporting to the mysterious man. Elsewhere, while still watching her from afar as she almost fell from the stand she is using, Takeru reveals himself to Rui and becomes friends with her, even though Aguri warns him about the consequences it may bring. While researching a way to detect the Madō Horrors, Burai and Zaruba detect a powerful Horror appearing. Upon finding the Horror and asking if he knows Kensui, Ryuga finds himself being photographed by Kazami. After drawing the Horror to a point where he dons the Garo armor with Kazami seeing the transformation, Ryuga destroys the camera and tells the reporter that the creatures are Horrors and that is all he needs to know. Though Ryuga tells Rian not to erase his memory out of empathy, Kazami heads to Vol City's television station the next day.
9	"Sonshi"; Transliteration: "Sonshi" (Japanese: 乱～Sonshi～)	Itaru Era	May 31, 2013
Kazami disregards Ryuga's warning to no longer interfere, having taken the camera's memory card out before the Makai Knight destroyed the device, and goes to Vol City's TV station to have his old friend Rivera, a local newscaster, show it. However, as Ryuga and Rian infiltrate the station to stop him, Rivera airs the broadcast with Kazami's photo altered so it looks like Ryuga is a murderer. Kazami learns that Rivera is the Madō Horror who killed his girlfriend, before Rivera devours him for refusing to join her side. Ryuga is now on the run, as everyone who had trusted him has turned on him with this new evidence against him. Luckily, by night fall, Tousei appears to pick up Ryuga in his car to save him. However, they are attacked by Sonshi, the mysterious man who used Kazami to further the Madō Horrors' goal. With Tousei knocked unconscious, Sonshi informs Ryuga of Kazami's death and is overpowered by him, just as Takeru and Aguri come to his aid. Despite fighting together, the three have a hard time against Sonshi, who assume his armored Madō Horror form to counter them after they don their Makai Knight armors. After Garo manages to land a blow on him, his armor turns gold and weakns him. The Madō Horror is forced to fall back when Burai arrives. Though he is wounded, and now motivated by his guilt over Kazami's death, Ryuga checks on Tousei and pleads with him not involve himself in the Makai Knight's affairs any further. When asked what he will do now as a public enemy, Ryuga tells Tousei that he will continue to fight the Horrors as he limps toward the sunrise.
10	"Promise"; Transliteration: "Puromisu" (Japanese: 誓～Promise～)	Kei Taguchi	June 7, 2013
A high school girl named Haruka Kitajima claims to have seen a monster's shadow after school hours while looking for her lost cell phone. With no one believing her story, Haruka turns to her class mate Hiroki Tsuboi for help, as she knows his father works for SG1. As he has feelings for her, Hiroki agrees to help Haruka out but is unable to see his father and give him Haruka's message. Upon learning that Haruka has been transferred to another school the next day, Hiroki goes to her house and finds it completely empty before discovering that he is being stalked by Ryuga. Ryuga confronts him after a PTA meeting, and reveals to Hiroki that Haruka was killed by a Horror that he is hunting down, while advising the boy to leave if he values his life. As he is about to leave, Hiroki is approached by his teacher Ms. Toyama and he reveals to her what Ryuga told him. However, Ms. Toyama reveals that she is indeed the monster that Ryuga was talking about and prepares to eat the boy, when Ryuga comes to his aid. With Ryuga preventing her from feeding on the child, she reveals that she has only eaten students without any future and when Haruka discovered the truth about her, she had to eat the girl and her entire family. With Hiroki knocked out, Ryuga does battle with the Horror, and after donning the Garo armor manages to slay the monster. When Hiroki comes to, he grieves over Haruka's death as he could do nothing to stop it, but Ryuga reassures him by telling him he did all he could. However, Hiroki's father arrives and tries to arrest Ryuga. Hiroki interferes, allowing the Makai Knight to escape. The next day, Ms. Toyama's disappearance is covered up, and Hiroki vows to support Ryuga, even though the entire city is against the Makai Knight.
11	"Desire"; Transliteration: "Dezaia" (Japanese: 虜～Desire～)	Hisako Fujihira	June 14, 2013
After using a man named Sam to get a diamond to finish a Madō Bullet, Rian gets into an argument with Ryuga over her morals. Feeling guilty, Rian decides to find Sam the next day to return the diamond. However, he reveals that he has been invited to the gentleman's club Paradaice. When he goes that night, he falls under the spell of a Horror named Boara. By the time Rian arrives to stop him, Sam emerges a changed man and dumps her as the Paradaice girls humiliate her. Returning to Burai's home, Rian confinds to Ryuga that she became a Makai Priestess for the wrong reasons. Ryuga tells her that she is not hateful as she thinks that she has helped many people. Upon returning to Burai's chambers, Ryuga and Rian learn that Paradaice is a front to get rid of the Kaneshiro Group's enemies. Posing as a man, Rian infiltrates Paradaice with Ryuga to knock out Sam and the other patrons. After dealing with the Paradaice girls, Ryuga aids Rian in dealing with Boara as she reveals a bit of the Makai Knight's past. Upon telling the Horror that he does not need her help, Ryuga dons the Garo armor and slays Boara. On the way back to Burai's, Ryuga and Rian have a slightly romantic moment.
12	"Trap"; Transliteration: "Torappu" (Japanese: 報～Trap～)	Hisako Fujihira	June 21, 2013
As Rivera continues her anti-Ryuga propaganda, Burai finally comes up with a method to detect the Madō Horrors but needs a sample from a live one to complete it once Aguri returns with the crystal required for the sequence. As Burai suspects Rivera to a Madō Horror, he has Rian infiltrate Vol TV to pose as Rivera's hairdresser and confirm their suspicions when she sneaked into the makeup room and found capsules holding human souls. Once Rian sends her findings to Burai, she finds her cover blown as Rivera calls Ryuga out. Once the new broadcast is over, having all the humans leave with her magic, Rian learns Rivera's true feelings for the people as she finds herself in a losing battle against the Madō Horror. Luckily, Ryuga arrives before Rivera could eat Rian as she kicks the girl away. Managing to take Kazami's gun from Ryuga turning their fight, Rivera admits that she killed him before shooting the Makai Knight multiple times in the chest. However, learning that Rian and Takeru have filmed the event to make it look like she murdered him in cold blood, Rivera finds that Ryuga placed a charm on his person to protect him from the bullets. Assuming her Horror form, Rivera battles Garo before running off when he sliced her tongue off for Rin to procure. As Rivera vows revenge on Ryuga for destroying her livelihood, Burai completes the Madō Horror detection system and group learns that there are many of them at the city.
13	"Hunting"; Transliteration: "Hantingu" (Japanese: 狩～Hunting～)	Sumiko Umeda	June 28, 2013
With the Madō Horror sample they got from Rivera, Burai creates a Madō Horror detection music box that the Makai Knights use to take out two Madō Horrors posing as a city councilor and a doctor. From their confrontation with the councilor who was immune to his attacks, Aguri begins to doubt his worth as the current Gai and requests Burai to allow him to go to the Senate to learn more of the Madō Horrors. However, upon getting into an argument with Ryuga when he tries to help him, Aguri's departure is put on hold when Rian reveals the soul holding capsule that was on the doctor's person. They learn that Madō Horrors have a means to ration human souls which is being produced by Kaneshiro Foods. Ryuga and Aguri go in as workers to try to infiltrate the work force while Takeru and Rian take another route. Ryuga attempts to trigger the fire alarm to evacuate the civilians but Aguri stops him as it would attract the SG1 and hinder their plans. Eventually, the two groups converge where the souls are stored with Ryuga in tears as his psychometry has him hear the souls' unfilled dreams and desires. Rian then projects Ryuga's psychometry to show the scene of the people having their souls extracted and bodies burned, with Takeru almost losing his composure when it is revealed that Rui's family are among the victims. Also heart broken by the turn of events, Aguri triggers the alarm and tells Ryuga that they will kill every Horror remaining before SG1 comes. As Takeru deals with the Horrors familiars, Ryuga and Aguri confront Kaneshiro Foods manager Tsumazaki as he pursues Rian when she escapes with the crate of souls. With his attacks still having no effect, Aguri follows Ryuga's example to fight with all his force, pinning Tsumazaki down long enough for Ryuga to don the Garo armor and finish the Madō Horror off. Soon after, with a new found respect for Ryuga, Aguri joins the others to hold a funerary pyre for the souls to be at peace. Elsewhere, Rui looks up at the moon while unconsciously shedding tears for her forgotten family.
14	"Hyena"; Transliteration: "Haiena" (Japanese: 腐～Hyena～)	Hisako Fujihira	July 5, 2013
Ryuga and Rian are in a graveyard following rumors about a cursed grave keeper known as Hyena who they learn is a Madō Horror. As Ryuga prepares himself to kill him after Rian restores the Madō Horror's speech, Hyena begs for his life as he claims that there is a way to restore his humanity while acting lustful over Rian. After Rian leaves on Ryuga's call, Hyena reveals his true personality as he tells the Makai Knight how he was originally a psychologist stationed where the SG1 is now located. But his life took a plunge when his partner, a client of his, turned him into a monster and forced him into the graveyard after stripping him of his voice. By the time he finished his story, Hyena reveals he knew that Rian left behind a charm to overhear their conversation while she, Takeru, and Aguri check his story out. Annoyed, especially with the acid milk he was almost tricked by Hyena into drinking, Ryuga demanded if the client is Kaneshiro. But Hyena instead tells Ryuga the legend of the Horror Zedom, the creator of the first Madō Horrors who was torn apart long ago by the Makai Knights with his parts hidden in separate places around the world. Hyena also reveals that Zedom's head is buried somewhere in Vol City and the song that is played by the goddess statues is actually Zedom's requiem he claims it to have been sung by an opera singer named Sophia who mysteriously disappeared. Following Hyena's instructions to uncover the truth behind Vol City, Takeru and Aguri break into the house of Maki, a violinist who was the last person Sophia was with. Finding a violin bow there, the two Makai Knights learn that Sophia was killed by Maki who is revealed to be a Horror. Despite doubting Hyena's intentions, with Ryuga holding him at sword point, Takeru and Aguri take the bow to marshland ruins where they find themselves in an ambush. By that time, Hyena takes a moment of distraction to restrain Ryuga, revealing that he has been lying about a means to restore Madō Horrors to humans. Ryuga then manages to trick Hyena into cutting himself with his sword, using the shock wave to break free and slay the Madō Horror. Later, with Hyena revealed to be Kaneshiro's son, Rian confirms the legitimacy of the Zedom legend while confronting Burai about him knowing something about the statues' song.
15	"Hint"; Transliteration: "Hinto" (Japanese: 謎～Hint～)	Kei Taguchi	July 12, 2013
Rian follows Ryuga into nearby forest without the Makai Knight explaining himself to her, thinking of the two types of Horror. As he reminisces about the events that occurred since he arrived at Vol City, Ryuga arrives at a cliff with a nice view of the city and starts gathering rocks. As she helps Ryuga, noticing him crying over the people he failed to save, Rian assures him that he saved many despite him telling her the only way to save everyone in Vol City is take out the one controlling the Madō Horrors: Kaneshiro. From there, Rian brings up the Zedom legend that Hyena revealed to them and comes to the conclusion Kaneshiro may have found Zedom's seeds and used them to sire the Madō Horrors. Soon after, Rian learns that Ryuga was trained by Burai as a child and earned the Garo title after defeating Ragō. Once adding a wooden cross and dream catcher to the pile of rocks, Ryuga reveals that it is a grave for his late mother that he usually erects wherever he goes. Though Rian tells him they never learned who sang the song, the Makai Knight thinking of his armor's relation to the monsters and images of his mother, Ryuga resolves to rid of the Madō Horrors in Vol City to uncover the truth and make a real grave for his mother once it is over.
16	"Lost"; Transliteration: "Rosuto" (Japanese: 友～Lost～)	Itaru Era	July 19, 2013
Burai and Zaruba realize that the Zedom requiem song has weakened, which is an advent to its impending resurrection. Disguised as members of the press, Rian and Aguri watch a demonstration of SG1's newest weapon, the "Fist Bomb" when Sonshi and Kensui Kaneshiro appear. Rian is stopped upon trying to approach Kensui but Enhou bails her out. Rian meets Enhou later at the bar and discovers that she is a Madō Horror, but Enhou, despite having the upper hand, claims that she has no orders to eat her, thus she lets her leave. In anguish with this revelation, Rian seeks Burai's advice and learns from him that the plants originated from Zedom's seeds are used to transform normal humans in Madō Horrors under control of whoever implants them into their bodies, while Zaruba shares the same information with the others, and Burai entrusts Ragō to Rian. Believing that Kensui is behind the Madō Horrors, the group storms his location by having Aguri and Takeru distract the guards while the others proceed further. Burai confronts Sonshi while Rian fights Enhou assisted by Ryuga, but distraught with the possibility that Enhou might be turned into a Madō Horror against her will and that she could be returned to normal she asks Ryuga to stay his blade. Leaving her behind to assist Burai, the group reunites with him. Suddenly, Kensui shoves Sonshi away and claims to Ryuga that he is innocent. Upon confirming that Kensui is not a Horror, they hear from him that the true culprit behind the Madō Horrors is Tousei, much to Ryuga's surprise.
17	"Tousei"; Transliteration: "Tōsei" (Japanese: 裏～Tousei～)	Itaru Era	July 26, 2013
As Ryuga and the others learn the truth about Tousei, it is revealed that he was the one who turned Enhou into a Madō Horror and approached Ryuga with the intention of doing the same to him as well, but eventually decided to wait for his Garo armor to recover its lost radiance first, which got stronger with each Madō Horror defeated, and now only a single Zedom seed is left, which he intends to use on him. Leaving Kensui under Burai's care, the rest of the group looks for Tousei at his steakhouse without success and realizing that his family is in danger, they split up in search for them, but Takeru and Aguri arrive too late to stop Rivera and Enhou from devouring all of them, while Tousei and Sonshi defeat Burai and flee taking Kensui with them. Upon learning that the rest of his family is dead, Tousei orders Sonshi to devour his father as well. Ryuga and Rian find a wounded Burai who reveals that he sent Ragō to track down the Madō Horrors and it is announced that the entire Kaneshiro family is killed except for Tousei who assumes control of the group and Ryuga's party is incriminated for it.
18	"War"; Transliteration: "Wō" (Japanese: 闘～War～)	Kei Taguchi	August 2, 2013
Now branded as criminals, Ryuga and his companions decide to go after Tousei after Ragō reveals where he is hiding. Leaving an unconscious Burai behind, the party ignores Zaruba's warnings and storm Tousei's office to confront him despite knowing it is a trap. But once finding him on the top floor, the group learns that Tousei has been human the entire time as he provokes them to break their taboo on taking human life before telling them to follow him. As Burai regains consciousness and goes after them, Ryuga and the others find themselves in the ruins of an ancient Makai Priest village underneath Vol City. With orders to spare just Ryuga and Rian, Sonshi, Enhou and Rivera fight the Makai Knights while Rian goes after Tousei. As Burai reaches the ruins and discovers that Zedom is stirring, Rian reaches a temple where she finds a girl being held before being attacked by the ribbons. When Ryuga is pinned down by Sonshi after seeing Rian in trouble, Tousei attempts to use the last Madō Horror Plant on him. However, Takeru intervenes and is forced to chop off his hand to keep the infection from spreading. With Aguri taking Takeru to safety, Ryuga attempts to rescue Rian with Burai. However, overwhelmed with fighting all three Madō Horrors, Ryuga held down by Rivera and Enhou as Sonshi renders the Makai Knight blind with a sword to the eyes.
19	"Hope"; Transliteration: "Hōpu" (Japanese: 光～Hope～)	Kei Taguchi	August 9, 2013
In SG1's Solitary Confinement, Ryuga trains despite being blinded by Sonshi before telling Burai to escape with the girl. Upon finding Zaruba on his person, the ring asks him why he is not accepting his fate. Ryuga believes it is because of his mother. Elsewhere, upon finding Aguri bringing in Takeru, Burai reveals to them that Ryuga has been blinded and that the girl he took with him is a Makai Priestess held by Tousei. Elsewhere, managing to escape captivity and relying on his other senses to fend off SG1 members, Ryuga takes to the sewers after accidentally hurting a civilian during his escape. Though he loses all of his confidence and considers giving up being a Makai Knight, Ryuga remembers what he went through as a child to obtain the title and makes a beeline to the Garouken. Aguri reaches the similar conclusion of their ally's destination as he and Takeru make their way to Tousei's building where he they attempt to fight off Sonshi's Horror servants until Ryuga arrives. With Aguri holding Sonshi at bay, Ryuga regains the Garouken as he and the others leave shortly before the SG1 arrive. Despite the odds stacked against them, the three Makai Knights intend to still fight with Zaruba finally forming a contract with Ryuga. Back in the Makai Priest Village, believing himself to have won, Tousei plans his next move as he reveals to Rian that she will become the vessel for a new batch of Madō Horror Plants.
20	"Mother"; Transliteration: "Mazā" (Japanese: 母～Mother～)	Itaru Era; Hisako Fujihira	August 16, 2013
Ryuga, who has been brought back to their hideout by Takeru and Aguri, is reunited with his mother Hakana who is revealed to have been the young girl that Burai rescued before he restored her age and memories. Hakana then reveals how she and another priestess named Sari took part in a ritual under the Hill of Zedom's Arm fifteen years ago in an attempt to restore the Garo armor's radiance with support from Burai, Sari's brother Rikyo, and their Makai Knight protector Sonshi. However, after a Madō Horror Plant was created, a grenade detonated and Zedom's seal turned into a Horror gate with Burai becoming separated from the others during the chaos and Hakana knocked unconscious. After Sonshi dispatched the Horrors, he ended up being turned into a Madō Horror by the mastermind of the incident: Tousei Kaneshiro. On Tousei's orders, Sonshi was forced to devour Sari and then mortally wound Rikyo before spiriting off Hakana to the Hill of Zedom's Head under Vol City. After he woke up and promised a dying Rikyo that he would care for Rian, Burai believed Hakana to be dead. However, she was instead forced into germinating more Madō Horror Plants at the cost of her memories as she slowly became a child overtime. With the truth revealed, Ryuga apologizes for not realizing she was alive when he first heard her song. Soon after, Hakana restores Ryuga's eyesight by sacrificing her own. Thanking Burai for allowing him to fulfill the promise he made to his mother, Ryuga is joined by the other Makai Knights as they race to rescue Rian.
21	"Justice"; Transliteration: "Jasutisu" (Japanese: 義～Justice～)	Itaru Era; Hisako Fujihira	August 23, 2013
In the Makai Priest temple, Rian is being prepared for the ritual that would make her into the new Zedom's Requiem singer. On the way to the Hill of Zedom's Head, when Rivera brings up their friendship, Rian is a bit heart broken when Enhou explains that Horrors have no friends. When Enhou is alerted by the SG1 that the Makai Knights are heading to their position, Rivera leaves to deal with them while Enhou takes Rian to their final destination. Upon arrival, Rian is forced into drinking a poison that Tousei explains will compel the Makai Priestess to sing Zedom's Requiem. However, with Aguri and Takeru holding back Rivera and her minions, Ryuga manages to stop Enhou from having Rian absorb the seeds. However, one of the seeds falls into the seal and awakens Zedom, frightening Tousei. Annoyed with Rian telling him that it is his fault that the Horror is waking up, Tousei orders Enhou to capture the girl while he escapes. Ryuga and Enhou battle, eventually taking their fight outside while she remembers who she was and that in their meeting she made him the victim, Ryuga battles Enhou with Rian also intending to end her friend's suffering. Managing to hold Enhou in place, Rian enables Ryuga to land the deathblow on the Madō Horror. Upon seeing that her friend has died with a smile on her face and her body still human, Rian decides to make sure that Enhou does not die a monster by using a spell to assume her form. Arriving just as Rivera rallies the SG1 to kill Aguri and Takeru, "Enhou" tells the soldiers that Rivera is their true enemy and tricks Rivera into attacking her. Rivera deals a fatal wound to "Enhou" and Rian uses a smoke bomb to replace herself with the real Enhou's body to give the illusion that Enhou was murdered by the Madō Horror. With the SG1 turning their weapons on her, Rivera is forced to escape with the soldiers turning their attention to Enhou's body as they take their captain away. Watching the events unfold, Ryuga holds Enhou's necklace and senses the lamentation of her humanity over what she has done. This makes him promise Rian that there will be no more Madō Horrors. Later that night, Rian has a dream of meeting Enhou in what appears to an ideal Vol City and she wonders if this is what her friend dreamed of.
22	"Master"; Transliteration: "Masutā" (Japanese: 礼～Master～)	Itaru Era	August 30, 2013
Since Enhou's death, the Makai Knights and SG1 are now working together, with the latter entrusted to keep the populace safe while the Makai Knights go after Rivera. However, Rivera uses her tongue to track them to their base and she arrives the next day with the intent to take Rian. Luckily, the Makai Knights arrive to cover the Makai Priests' escape, with Takeru obtaining his Soul Metal Fist. After they manage to kill Rivera, with Aguri obtaining a Soul Metal arrowhead, the Makai Knights learn that a Horror is faintly nearby. Ryuga is horrified to learn that Hakana is becoming a Horror as a side effect of germinating the Madō Horror Plants. The group then learn that Hakana, with Rian's help, has infused Burai with a Makai Echo Wave to approach Zedom's head to restore the seal. While Rian and SG1 try to get everyone out of the city, the Makai Knights accompany Burai to the Hill of Zedom's Head. Upon finding the Goddess Statue falling apart, Burai tells them that Zedom's resurrection and Hakana's transformation into a Horror are linked to its destruction. Burai and the Makai Knights encounter Tousei and Sonshi who are getting as far from the chaos as they can. After Tousei reveals that Burai intends to die to stop Zedom, insisting that the priest hurry up, he runs off after Burai sends Sonshi away with Aguri and Takeru. When Burai notices that he did not go with the others, Ryuga reveals that he knew Burai would die, Ryuga refuses to let the priest face Zedom alone. Burai tells Ryuga that he is leaving the future to him and the others, and he makes to way to the seal and enters it to face Zedom.
23	"Gold"; Transliteration: "Gōrudo" (Japanese: 輝～Gold～)	Itaru Era; Makoto Yokoyama	September 6, 2013
As Ryuga runs off to aid Aguri and Takeru against Sonshi, Burai enters Zedom's prison to offer his body to quench the Horror's fury. However, Zedom reveals his intention to take a Makai Knight's body to complete his plan and kills Burai when the Makai Priest attempts to stop him. By then, as Rian and Hakana arrive to the scene, Ryuga tells Aguri and Takeru about Burai's final orders for them as they attack Sonshi. Though he attempts to fall back to find Tousei, Sonshi is stopped by Zedom with the order to bring him the body of a Makai Knight as the Madō Horror decides to claim Ryuga's body to attend his request. After the long battle ends in a duel, admitting his respect for the former Makai Knight's strength and thanking him for showing him how to become strong, Ryuga manages to slay Sonshi with the Garo armor finally recovering its lost golden radiance. But suddenly, telling Rian that she feels the Garo armor's radiance, Hakana writhes in pain as Sonshi's body is teleported away. Zaruba proceeds to reveal that Zedom is almost free and has claimed the corpse as his vessel. Honoring Hakana's wish to die a human, Ryuga is left with no choice but to strike his mother down while promising her that he will live on. Leaving Hakana's body with a SG1 platoon, the heroes go back to the ruins as Tousei watches before recruiting the SG1 troopers to protect him. Once at the ruins, the Makai Knights and Rian find themselves under heavy fire by the revived Zedom.
24	"Future"; Transliteration: "Fyūchā" (Japanese: 照～Future～)	Itaru Era; Makoto Yokoyama	September 13, 2013
Though he intended to use the SG1 as human shields to survive the night, Tousei ends up being chased down by every Horror in Vol City as his malice attracts them all to him. Back in the Makai Priest city, forced to take cover from Zedom's attacks, Ryuga's group advances when Takeru uses himself as a distraction so Ryuga and Aguri can reach the Horror. However, Zedom manages to remove and seal Ryuga's Garo armor. The unprotected Ryuga is pulled by Zedom as the Horror intends to claim his body, but Burai's soul contacts Rian and entrusts her with his Madō Brush, guiding her to use it to activate the Makai Bagua to create a weak point in Zedom's protection. Aguri pierces through this point with his arrow and Takeru frees the Garo armor from Zedom's grasp, allowing Ryuga to don it once more. Once reunited with Ryuga, Takeru and Aguri are bathed in Garo's golden radiance and their armors also turn golden for a brief moment as the trio finally defeats Zedom. Some days later, after Rian erases the memories of themselves and the Horrors from all of the people in Vol City, it is revealed that Aguri was summoned to work at the Senate, Rian is ordered to guard the ancient ruins under the city, and Takeru is appointed to the Western region, bidding farewell to Rui before he leaves. But before leaving, Ryuga visits the Steakhouse where Tousei has returned. Though he pretended that his memories were also erased, Tousei is revealed to have become the host of the various Horrors that cornered him days ago. A fearful Tousei attempts to run from Ryuga, but is halted by Rian who personally kills him. Telling Ryuga that killing a weak coward like Tousei was beneath him, Rian reveals that Aguri agreed to stay behind and protect the ruins instead of her, as she has decided to stay by Ryuga's side. With a grave for Hakana set in the ancient ruins beneath the crumbled Goddess Statue, Ryuga and Rian leave Vol City for the south.
25	"Beginning"; Transliteration: "Biginingu" (Japanese: 道～Beginning～)	Itaru Era; Makoto Yokoyama	September 20, 2013
Following the incident with Zedom several years before, Burai meets Rian revealing that her father was killed and starts taking care of her as he promised. Feeling that he is unable to take care of Rian, Burai asks fellow Makai Priest Ouma to take Rian to start her Makai Priest training at Kantai despite being too young and after they depart, he sees Ryuga's training through the magic bowl before he attempts to commit suicide, but it is revealed that Ouma had realized what he would do and returns in time to stop him. After Ouma reprimands Burai, both priests figure that Rian is missing and start looking for her, while Rian returns and watches Ryuga through the magic bowl and starts singing. Burai and Ouma return and while hearing Rian's singing they reminisce about Hakana, and the day the three had seen the blackened Garo armor for the first time. It is revealed that the armor had exhausted all of its radiance after a great battle to save the world and that Hakana had heard the armor's voice asking her to restore it. Burai then decides to train Rian by himself before she reaches the proper age to study at Kantai. Ten years later, Ryuga inherits the Garo armor but leaves after learning of Hakana's fate and Rian returns from Kantai as a full fledged Makai Priest. Burai then reveals that he is leaving to Vol City and asks for her to accompany him. The story then shifts to Burai's reunion with Ryuga at Vol City.
