= Warre (ship) =

Several vessels have been named Warre:

- Warre (1802 ship) was launched at Kingston upon Hull in 1802. She initially primarily traded with the Baltic. From late 1806 to 1811 she was under charter to the Transportation Board. During this period she participated in the British invasion of the River Plate. Between 1812 and 1813 she made a voyage as a whaler in the British southern whale fishery. When she returned to London, her master discovered that both sets of owners had gone bankrupt while she was at sea. This resulted in a court case to determine who now owned the cargo. Warre then returned to trading widely until she was wrecked in 1823 in ice in the Baltic. Her remains were discovered in 2020, photographed, and documented in 2022.
- Warre, snow-rigged, was launched in 1817 at Newcastle and owned by Lamplugh. Her entry in Lloyd's Register (LR) carried the annotation "Lost". Warre, Bradley, master, departed from Saint Petersburg, Russia, on 16 September 1817, bound for London. Presumed subsequently foundered off Memel, Prussia with the loss of all hands.
