= Vall Creek =

Coordinates: 37°13′56″N 81°38′31″W

Location
- Country: United States
- State: West Virginia

Vall Creek is a stream in the U.S. state of West Virginia.

Vall Creek most likely was named after the local Vall (or Vaal) family.

== See also ==
- List of rivers of West Virginia
