= Guillermo Cervera =

Spanish photojournalist

- Born: 1968 (age 57–58); Madrid, Spain
- Occupation: Freelance photojournalist
- Known for: Photography (war, social issues, surf)

Guillermo Cervera Calonje (born 1968, Madrid, Spain) is a freelance photojournalist. He is known for documenting subjects such as conflicts, social issues, and surfing.

His photographs are regularly published in The New York Times, Newsweek, Marie Claire, The Guardian, Paris Match, Rolling Stone, La Vanguardia, ABC and El Mundo, EL Pais, National Geographic Adventure and have been exhibited in galleries in Madrid and Barcelona, Spain and New York.

== Early career ==
Growing up in Madrid, Spain, Guillermo Cervera first discovered photography when he found a box filled with Playboy magazines his father had brought from the United States. "Then my father learned what I was doing and he emptied the box of Playboys and replaced them with National Geographic," Cervera said in an interview with Lens – The New York Times' blog. It was in those old magazines that he first was dazzled by pictures of surfing.

Initially his family rejected the idea to become a photographer and he was sent to the United States to study aerospace engineering. While in college, he went on learning photography. In 1993, at a friend's suggestion, he agreed to go to Bosnia to cover the conflict in Bosnia to cover the conflict.

== Major works ==
=== Bosnia War ===
In 1993 Guillermo decided to travel to Bosnia with Alfonso de Senillosa to photograph the conflict for Epoca Magazine.

=== Surfing ===
Over the last few years, in between conflicts Cervera photographs surfers as a way to cope with the stress and trauma that accompanied those assignments. He regularly publishes in surf photography journals

ications of this subject.

=== Libya conflict ===
In April 2011, he was with photojournalists Tim Hetherington and Chris Hondros during a mortar attack in Misrata, Libya. Tim Hetherington and Hondros were killed.

In Chad, it was from a brief — though harrowing — detention, where he was threatened with torture.

=== Bye bye Kabul ===
Since 2008 Cervera has worked primarily in Kabul, Afghanistan, where he has worked embedded on long term projects on the daily life of the Taliban, and the economic force of the Western arms market. He has been the first Spanish photographer who published a cover pictured in Newskweek. The picture was a Taliban portrait and it was selected by Newsweek as one of the covers of the Year in 2011. In 2013 he presented at Virreina LAB, Barcelona, "Bye-Bye Kabul", an exhibition of 49 photographs taken over a four-year period in Kabul, Afghanistan.

=== Ukraine ===
Since the beginning of the uprising in Ukraine, Cervera has been covering the different events in the country focusing his work in the daily life of the Ukrainian people. His work has been published in MSNBC.

=== The Circle ===
The Circle is a documentary about Guillermo Cevera travelling the world on a sailboat.

=== Trade Arms Market ===
A serial of reportages about the Arms market and his father who is an arms dealer.

=== National Geographic ===
The past years until now, Cervera is collaborating with National Geographic (@natgeoadventure) publishing images in the Instagram of @natgeoadventure weekly.
