= War, West Virginia =

- City
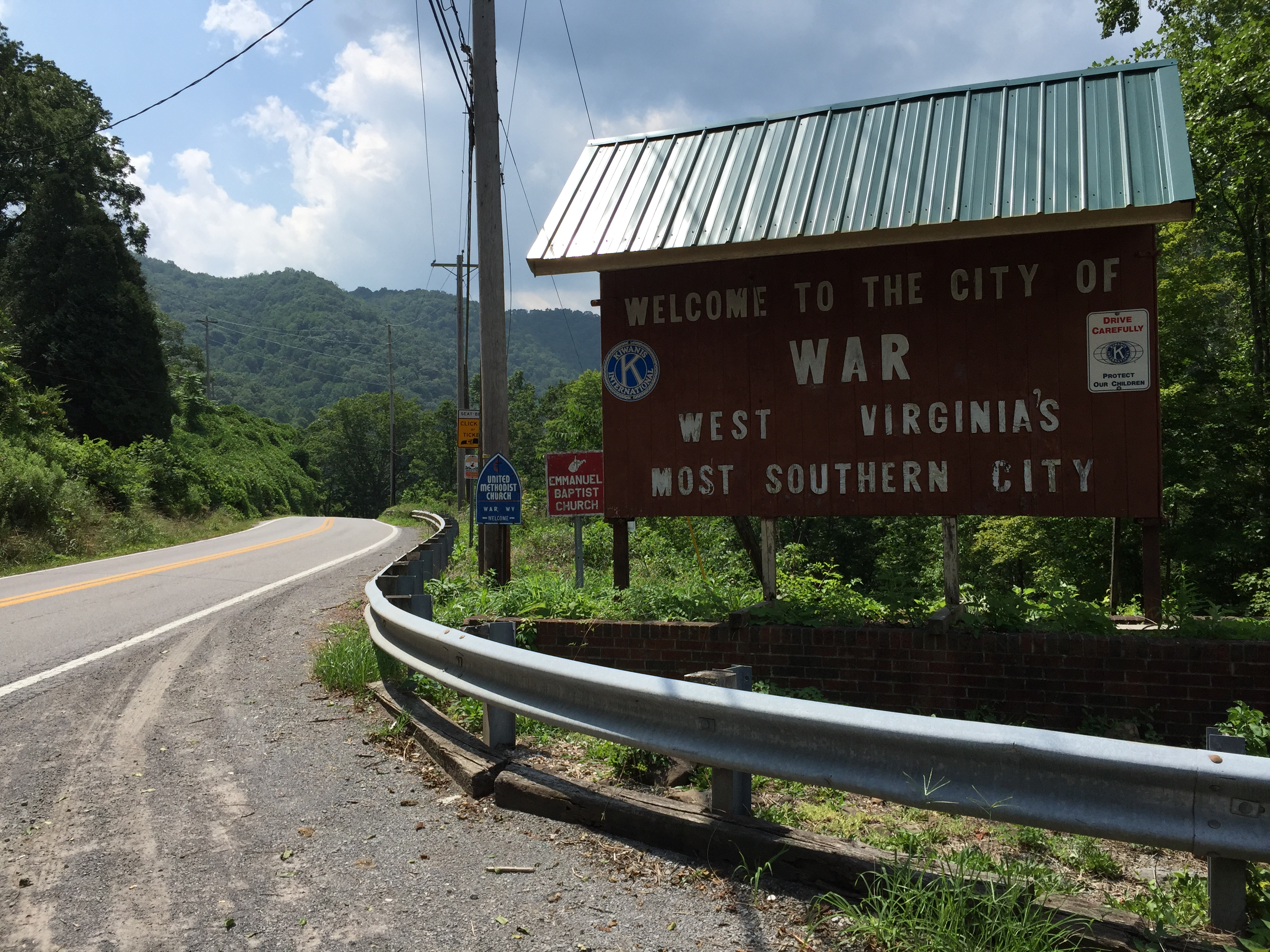
- Nickname: West Virginia's most southern city
- Location of War in McDowell County, West Virginia

- Location in the State of West Virginia
- Coordinates: 37°18′4″N 81°41′3″W
- Country: United States
- State: West Virginia
- County: McDowell
- Incorporated: 1920
- Named for: War Creek

Government
  - Mayor: David Deel

Area
  - Total: 0.92 sq mi (2.38 km^{2})
  - Land: 0.89 sq mi (2.31 km^{2})
  - Water: 0.031 sq mi (0.08 km^{2})
- Elevation: 1,342 ft (409 m)

Population (2020)
  - Total: 623
  - Estimate (2019): 662
  - Density: 768.8/sq mi (296.85/km^{2})
- Time zone: UTC-5 (EST)
  - Summer (DST): UTC-4 (EDT)
- ZIP code: 24892
- Area code: 304
- FIPS code: 54-84484
- GNIS feature ID: 1555916
- Website: cityofwarwv.com

War is a city in McDowell County, West Virginia, United States. The population was 690 at the 2020 census. War was incorporated in 1920 by the Circuit Court of McDowell County. Its name is derived from War Creek, whose confluence with Dry Fork is located within the city. War is the only place in the United States with this name. War was formerly known as Miner's City.

== History ==
War developed originally as a coal town in the Tug Fork valley of southern McDowell County during the early twentieth century as the Pocahontas Coalfield was opened for large scale commercial mining. The arrival of the Norfolk and Western Railway into the region made the exploitation of the rich smokeless coal seams economically viable by providing direct access to markets across the eastern United States and to the port of Norfolk, Virginia.

Coal mining became the dominant industry in and around War, with nearby mines extracting the Pocahontas coal seams, particularly the Pocahontas No. 3 seam, which was valued for both steam generation and metallurgical use. Like many communities in McDowell County, War developed as a 'company town' where housing, shops and public facilities were closely associated with the local coal operators.

The Norfolk and Western Railway reached War in 1904, with the construction of its Dry Fork Branch, providing the transportation link that enabled the rapid development of the surrounding coal mines. The Norfolk and Western Railway remained central to the town's economy throughout much of the twentieth century, transporting coal from the mines around War to steelworks, power stations and for export. Passenger services were of secondary importance, with the railway existing principally to serve the coal industry.

Following the Second World War, increasing mechanisation enabled coal production to continue with a much smaller workforce, resulting in substantial job losses across McDowell County. From the 1950s, onwards many of the smaller mines serving War were progressively consolidated or closed as production shifted to fewer, larger and more mechanised operations. The decline of coal mining in the late 20th century led to a sustained reduction in population and economic activity, although mining continues elsewhere in McDowell County on a far smaller scale than during the industry's peak.

=== Notable buildings ===
War's notable buildings were those associated with the railway and the town's educational development. The Norfolk and Western Railway constructed a depot when its line reached War in 1904, helping to establish the town as the commercial centre for the surrounding coal mining communities. War Elementary School was constructed in 1923, during a period of rapid population and commercial growth linked to the nearby coal mines. Big Creek High School followed in 1932–1933 and became the principal secondary school serving War and neighbouring communities. The school had a separate gymnasium, dating from about 1950, whuch was identified by a countywide historic resources survey as locally significant for its association with education. At the town's height, its built environment also included three cinemas, numerous shops and fifteen churches, reflecting War's former importance as a retail, educational and social centre for the surrounding coalfield.

== Geography ==
According to the United States Census Bureau, the city has a total area of 0.92 square miles (2.38 km^{2}), of which 0.89 square miles (2.31 km^{2}) is land and 0.03 square miles (0.08 km^{2}) is water.

War had a railway station on the Norfolk Southern Railway (former Norfolk and Western).

== Demographics ==
Historical population
Census	Pop.	Note	%±
1930	1,392		—
1940	1,277		−8.3%
1950	3,992		212.6%
1960	3,006		−24.7%
1970	2,004		−33.3%
1980	2,158		7.7%
1990	417		−80.7%
2000	788		89.0%
2010	862		9.4%
2020	623		−27.7%
2021 (est.)	662		6.3%
U.S. Decennial Census

=== 2020 census ===
As of the 2020 census, War had a population of 623. The median age was 49.5 years. 18.0% of residents were under the age of 18 and 24.2% of residents were 65 years of age or older. For every 100 females there were 101.6 males, and for every 100 females age 18 and over there were 106.0 males age 18 and over.

0.0% of residents lived in urban areas, while 100.0% lived in rural areas.

There were 287 households in War, of which 24.0% had children under the age of 18 living in them. Of all households, 40.8% were married-couple households, 25.8% were households with a male householder and no spouse or partner present, and 26.5% were households with a female householder and no spouse or partner present. About 36.3% of all households were made up of individuals and 17.1% had someone living alone who was 65 years of age or older.

There were 370 housing units, of which 22.4% were vacant. The homeowner vacancy rate was 3.5% and the rental vacancy rate was 8.7%.

Racial composition as of the 2020 census
Race	Number	Percent
White	580	93.1%
Black or African American	31	5.0%
American Indian and Alaska Native	0	0.0%
Asian	0	0.0%
Native Hawaiian and Other Pacific Islander	0	0.0%
Some other race	0	0.0%
Two or more races	12	1.9%
Hispanic or Latino (of any race)	0	0.0%

=== 2010 census ===
As of the census of 2010, there were 862 people, 373 households, and 243 families living in the city. The population density was 968.5 inhabitants per square mile (373.9/km^{2}). There were 436 housing units at an average density of 489.9 per square mile (189.2/km^{2}). The racial makeup of the city was 94.7% White, 3.2% African American, 0.6% Native American, and 1.5% from two or more races. Hispanic or Latino of any race were 0.6% of the population.

There were 373 households, of which 27.6% had children under the age of 18 living with them, 46.1% were married couples living together, 13.4% had a female householder with no husband present, 5.6% had a male householder with no wife present, and 34.9% were non-families. 28.7% of all households were made up of individuals, and 13.5% had someone living alone who was 65 years of age or older. The average household size was 2.31 and the average family size was 2.78.

The median age in the city was 44.7 years. 19.5% of residents were under the age of 18; 6.8% were between the ages of 18 and 24; 23.9% were from 25 to 44; 30.2% were from 45 to 64; and 19.7% were 65 years of age or older. The gender makeup of the city was 49.2% male and 50.8% female.

=== 2000 census ===
As of the census of 2000, there were 788 people, 331 households, and 225 families living in the city. The population density was 870.6 people per square mile (334.3/km^{2}). There were 388 housing units at an average density of 428.7 per square mile (164.6/km^{2}). The racial makeup of the city was 94.67% White, 4.57% African American, 0.25% Native American, 0.38% from other races, and 0.13% from two or more races. Hispanic or Latino of any race were 0.63% of the population.

There were 331 households, out of which 28.7% had children under the age of 18 living with them, 50.5% were married couples living together, 14.8% had a female householder with no husband present, and 32.0% were non-families. 29.3% of all households were made up of individuals, and 13.0% had someone living alone who was 65 years of age or older. The average household size was 2.38 and the average family size was 2.93.

In the city, the population was spread out, with 24.5% under the age of 18, 5.5% from 18 to 24, 26.1% from 25 to 44, 27.7% from 45 to 64, and 16.2% who were 65 years of age or older. The median age was 41 years. For every 100 females, there were 86.7 males. For every 100 females age 18 and over, there were 83.1 males.

The median income for a household in the city was $16,012, and the median income for a family was $20,521. Males had a median income of $32,500 versus $18,438 for females. The per capita income for the city was $9,285. About 34.8% of families and 43.3% of the population were below the poverty line, including 66.5% of those under age 18 and 15.1% of those age 65 or over.

== Notable people ==
- Carl Rutherford, blues musician

== See also ==
- Warriormine, West Virginia
