= War Creek =

River in the West Virginia, US

Coordinates: 37°18′10″N 81°41′26″W

War Creek is a stream in the U.S. state of West Virginia.

War Creek was named due to the frequent battles between frontiersmen and Native Americans that took place near this stream.

== See also ==
- List of rivers of West Virginia
