= Garo: Makai Retsuden =

Japanese anthology TV show in the Garo franchise

- Genre: Tokusatsu; Horror; Drama; Superhero fiction
- Created by: Keita Amemiya
- Written by: Keita Amemiya; Kei Taguchi; Itaru Era; Yoshinobu Kamo
- Directed by: Mitsuyoshi Abe; Yasuhiro Matsuda; Ryu Kaneda; Akira Ohashi; Ikko Yamagishi
- Starring: Yukijiro Hotaru
- Opening theme: "Garo ~Makai Retsuden~"
- Ending theme: "Kagaribi no Yume" by Makai Kagekidan
- Composers: Yoshichika Kuriyama; Shiho Terada; Yoichi Matsuo
- Country of origin: Japan
- Original language: Japanese
- No. of episodes: 12

Production
- Executive producer: Kiyotaka Ninomiya
- Producers: Kōichi Hirata; Yūsuke Kawanami
- Running time: 24-25 minutes (per episode)

Original release
- Network: TX Network
- Release: April 8 – June 24, 2016

Related
- Garo: Gold Storm Sho; Zero: Dragon Blood

Garo: Makai Retsuden (牙狼〈GARO〉－魔戒烈伝－; lit. "Garo: History of Makai") is an anthology television series which features the cast of the several live action series produced along the years in the Garo metaseries, celebrating its 10th anniversary. It aired between April 8 and June 24, 2016.

== Setting ==
The series is a collection of individual episodes featuring characters from the previous installments of the Garo franchise, each of them narrated by Yukijiro Hotaru, reprising his role as Gonza Kurahashi.

== Cast ==
- Gonza Kurahashi (倉橋 ゴンザ, Kurahashi Gonza): Yukijirō Hotaru (螢 雪次朗, Hotaru Yukijirō)
- Rekka (烈花; 1, 8, 12): Mary Matsuyama (松山 メアリ, Matsuyama Meari)
- Shiguto (シグト; 1, 8, 12): Masahiro Kuranuki (倉貫 匡弘, Kuranuki Masahiro)
- Kengi (ケンギ; 1): Kanji Tsuda (津田 寛治, Tsuda Kanji)
- Jinga (ジンガ; 2): Masahiro Inoue (井上 正大, Inoue Masahiro)
- Amily (アミリ, Amiri; 2): Miyavi Matsunoi (松野井 雅, Matsunoi Miyabi)
- Hikage (ヒカゲ; 2): Masami Okui (奥井 雅美, Okui Masami)
- Wataru Shijima (四十万 ワタル, Shijima Wataru; 3): Kenji Matsuda (松田 賢二, Matsuda Kenji)
- Mayuri (マユリ; 3): Natsumi Ishibashi (石橋 菜津美, Ishibashi Natsumi)
- Anna (アンナ; 3): Keiko Matsuzaka (松坂 慶子, Matsuzaka Keiko)
- Rian (莉杏; 4, 12): Miki Nanri (南里 美希, Nanri Miki)
- Ryuga Dougai (道外 流牙, Dōgai Ryūga; 4): Wataru Kuriyama (栗山 航, Kuriyama Wataru)
- Yuna (ユナ; 5): Riria Kojima (小島 梨里杏, Kojima Riria)
- Kain (カイン; 5): Naoki Takeshi (武子 直輝, Takeshi Naoki)
- Leo Fudō (布道 レオ, Fudō Reo; 5): Ozuno Nakamura (中村 織央, Nakamura Ozuno)
- Bikuu (媚空, Bikū; 6, 9): Sayaka Akimoto (秋元 才加, Akimoto Sayaka)
- Haruna (ハルナ; 7): Moka Komatsu (小松 もか, Komatsu Moka)
- Daigo Akizuki (秋月 ダイゴ, Akizuki Daigo; 7): Tomohito Wakizaki (脇崎 智史, Wakizaki Tomohito)
- Crow (クロウ, Kurō; 8): Atomu Mizuishi (水石 亜飛夢, Mizuishi Atomu)
- Eiji Busujima (毒島 エイジ, Busujima Eiji; 8): Show Aikawa (哀川 翔, Aikawa Shō)
- Akari (アカリ; 8): Rei Yoshii (吉井 怜, Yoshii Rei)
- Daichi (代知; 9): Kenta Suga (須賀 健太, Suga Kenta)
- Raiga Saejima (冴島 雷牙, Saejima Raiga; 9): Masei Nakayama (中山 麻聖, Nakayama Masei)
- Ryume (リュメ; 10): Sakina Kuwae (桑江 咲菜, Kuwae Sakina)
- Tsubasa Yamagatana (山刀 翼, Yamagatana Tsubasa; 11): Shouma Yamamoto (山本 匠馬, Yamamoto Shōma).
- Jabi (邪美; 11): Yasue Sato (佐藤 康恵, Satō Yasue)
- D Ringo (D・リンゴ; 12): Shigeru Izumiya (泉谷 しげる, Izumiya Shigeru)
- Yukihime (ユキヒメ; 12), Eyrith (エイリス, Eirisu; Voice; 12): Momoko Kuroki (黒木 桃子, Kuroki Momoko)
- Kouga Saejima (冴島 鋼牙, Saejima Kōga; 12): Ryosei Konishi (小西 遼生, Konishi Ryōsei)
- Heroic Spirit of Garo (英霊牙狼, Eirei Garo; Voice; 1): Rintarō Nishi (西 凛太朗, Nishi Rintarō)
- Madō Mirror Uruba (魔導具ウルバ, Madōgu Uruba; Voice; 3): Ai Orikasa (折笠 愛, Orikasa Ai)
- Madō Ring Zaruba (魔導輪ザルバ, Madōrin Zaruba; Voice; 9): Hironobu Kageyama (影山 ヒロノブ, Kageyama Hironobu)
- Madō Bracelet Goruba (魔導具ゴルバ, Madōgu Goruba; Voice; 11): Kenichi Ogata (緒方 賢一, Ogata Ken'ichi)
- Zaji (ザジ; Voice; 12): Hiroyuki Amano (天野 ひろゆき, Amano Hiroyuki)
- Next Preview Narrator, Madō Brooch Orva (魔導具オルヴァ, Madōgu Oruva; Voice; 8): Eri Ōzeki (大関 英里, Ōzeki Eri)

== Episodes ==
No.	Title	Original release date
1	"Requiem"; Transliteration: "Chinkonka" (Japanese: 鎮魂歌)	April 8, 2016
After sparring with Shiguto, the Makai Priestess Rekka is approached by Yukihide, the groundskeeper of the Forest Grave where the bodies of Makai Knights who not received their titles are buried. Accompanying Yukihide to the entrance of the Forest Grave, Rekka learns that the ghost of the Makai Knights have risen and taken his granddaughter Hibana. On the way to the grave site, explaining his family has been overseeing the Forest Grave for years to honor the nameless Makai Knight who saved them, Yukihide explains that a Makai Knight killed a Horror the day before the ghosts appeared. Rekka perceives that the Horror's presence may have stirred the ghosts and vows to save Hibana. Once at the grave site, Rekka attempts to reason with the spirits to no avail as they believe there is still a Horror living in the woods. Though Rekka rescues Hibana, attempting to stir the ghosts away with an illusion of Garo, they are unable to escape the specters. Luckily, remembering her father, Rekka uses the melody of her flute to pacify the ghosts. After dawn, having learned that Yukihide died a year ago, Rekka promises to teach Hibana her melody sometime before returning to the city.
2	"Full Moon"; Transliteration: "Amamitsuki" (Japanese: 天満月)	April 15, 2016
Years before the events of Garo: Gold Storm Sho, a quartet of Makai Priestesses travel from Seiran Valley to Homuro Village to deliver a Spirit Beast pelt. Led by Kisara, among them is a shy girl named Amily. As the group are half way to their destination, they are ambushed by bestial Horrors with Amily failing to escape with the pelt while the others fend the Horrors off. Luckily, the Makai Priestesses are saved by a Makai Knight who kills two of the Horrors while the third runs off with the Spirit Beast pelt after being wounded. The Makai Knight tells Yumeka and Zuuna to take the injured Kisara to Homuro Village while taking Amily with him to retrieve the pelt. The two, getting on each other's nerves, eventually find the Horror resting and the Makai Knight tells Amily to retrieve the pelt while he holds the Horror off while promising to tell her why he picked her after they reach Homuro Village. Though Amily makes a run for the village, she could not abandon the Makai Knight and aids him in killing the Horror. After tending to the Makai Knight's injuries, Amily finds a commonality with him over the moon before they make their way to Homura Village the following day. With the parcel delivered, learning he picked her as he needed someone loyal enough to protect others before herself, Amily learns the Makai Knight's name is Jinga and the two part ways with a promise to meet someday. Though the meeting between Jinga and Amily resulted in love, it would eventually become one of tragedy.
3	TBA	April 22, 2016
A group of Horrors residing in the Bon Jackpot bar learn from fellow Horror named Jan that a Makai Knight had attacked their other hideout and slayed their fellow Horrors Quickdraw Cane, Hustler Bean, and Dancer Jean. The Horrors proceed to get ready for the Makai Knight if he comes, realizing too late that the Makai Knight behind the attack, Wataru Shijima, posed as a captive to infiltrate their lair. Wataru proceeds to systematically kill the Horrors, saving the bartender for last as he kills him after being served a drink. Wataru reveals to Jan that he spared him so he can find the Bon Jackpot, but ends up killing the Horror before he could use to find the last Horror lair as planned. Running an errand for Gonza, Mayuri arrives to Cafe Anna to request Anna's help with a painting of a young Demon World Dragon that Raiga's father received from a Makai Priestess. The Demon World Dragon escapes the painting with Anna creating a barrier to prevent the fish from leaving the cafe, believing the Demon World Dragon was created to help Raiga when he is of age. Anna manages to seal the Demon World Dragon back into the painting, before proceeding to reinvigorate it with her magic. Mayuri learns more another the history of Makai Priests from Anna while asked if she has someone she wants to protect. Mayuri proceeds to take her leave with Anna telling her she is welcomed to come back anytime.
4	"Stranger"; Transliteration: "Ihōjin" (Japanese: 異邦人)	April 29, 2016
Before the events of Gold Storm Sho, Makai Priestess Rian is being harassed by a group of thugs before a homeless youth named Takumi attempts to help and ends up saving him instead. Takumi wants to repay Rian for her kindness, agreeing to let her spend the night at his place. Despite how the place that Takumi claimed to his home looked, Rian found the location suitable for her needs. Rian gets to know Takumi better as she confesses that she is on a special task to restore her amulets under the light of the moon. After finding Takumi attempting to rob her blind, Rian expresses disappointment in his actions and forgives him on the condition that he helps her build the altar for the ritual. Once the ritual ran its course, Takumi admits he was a louse to his girlfriend and time with Rian convinced him to run back to her and become a better person. The two encounter the gang leader after he became a Horror's host, Rian killing the Horror and telling a concerned Takumi that she and her friends work to protect others like him. Rian then inflicts Takumi with a memory charm to erase all memory of her and the Horror, the youth coming to with his resolve to make amends with his girlfriend unaffected. Rian meets with Ryuga after he slays a wasp Horror, giving him back his amulet before they proceed to the next town.
5	"Chivalry"; Transliteration: "Kishidō" (Japanese: 騎士道)	May 6, 2016
Makai Priestess Yuna and her partner Kain have been assigned to slay a creature hiding somewhere in the dam. After hours of searching, noting how hard she is trying to be more like a Makai Knight, Kain ends up driving Yuna away when he hurts her feelings when he told her she can never become a real Makai Knight. Kain realizes he messed up before hearing the sound of rumbling, finding Yuna fighting a Tekki-type Gōryū before he is knocked out by a mysterious assailant. Though outmatched, Yuna is able to fight the Tekki on equal terms both her Makai Sword and Makai Brush before reaching her limits. But Yuna is saved by Leo Fudō, knowing of the man as he reveals that he was sent to test Yuna's worth to be in the Senate. But Yuna turns down the offer to become a knight of the Senate with Leo accepting her decision while revealing that a mutual friend was the one who selected her and Kain for the mission. After welcoming Kain as he comes limping out from straining his leg, Yuna sings to heal their wounds before they take their leave.
6	"Rootless Wanderer"; Transliteration: "Nenashigusa" (Japanese: 根無草)	May 13, 2016
Following the regiment of meditation and training, Bikuu realizes she is being followed by a young Makai Priestess. Claiming to being chased, the Makai Priestess introduces herself as Erika and asks Bikuu if can accompany her. Bikuu decides to allow it while telling Erika her name, the two taking a momentary breather as Erika attempts to give Bikuu a sacred blade that heals the sick. But Bikuu refuses to carry the blade for Erika, later teaching her an illumination spell before they make camp where Erika attempts to have Bikuu open up to no avail. Later than night, Erika makes an attempt on Bikuu's life and hesitates, waking up Bikuu as a consequence before the two fight each other. Erika reveals that she is an assassin hired to kill Bikuu before running off, but Bikuu's escape route is blocked by puppets created by her handler. Erika pleas for another chance before she is forced to fight for her life as Bikuu arrives. Though conflicted over her duty and Bikuu telling she lacks the will to kill her, Erika saves Bikuu as she uses a long-range spell to kill Erika's handler. The next day, after Bikuu tells Erika to find new purpose by fighting for herself and her right to life, the two part ways.
7	"Transfer Student"; Transliteration: "Tenkōsei" (Japanese: 転校生)	May 20, 2016
After the events of Gold Storm Sho, Haruna enrolls as a student at Seiaikan High to live a normal life at the behest of her brother Gald. On her first day, despite upsetting the Astronomy Club president Ibuki before another student named Meguru comes to her aid, Haruna is able to make friends with Miki and Saeko. One evening, Haruna crosses paths with Meguru while on her way home and agrees to have dinner with him. The next day, Haruna finds out the school's new PE teacher is Daigo as he reveals that he tracked a Horror to the school and that it is hiding somewhere in it. Though it should not concern her as she meets with Meguru, Haruna realizes the Horror's whereabouts and runs back to school to save Miki and the others with her magic. She tend confronts Ibuki, revealed to be the Horror Camphanto whose power enabled her to assume the form of her victims. Camphanto assumes her true form as Meguru appears and tries to take Haruna to safety, only for the Horror to block their escape while Haruna attempts to retrieve Meguru's good-luck charm after it fell off his person. The Horror was about to kill them when Daigo arrives and slays the monster. The next day, hearing Daigo left, Haruna decides to drop out of high school to resume her Makai Priestess duties with Meguru seeing her off.
8	TBA	May 27, 2016
While walking in town, Shiguto gets hit on the head by a broken Cymbal-banging monkey toy of a young anti-social girl named Sachi. Shiguto fixes it and brings the toy up, meeting Sachi's young single mother named Kyoko as he ends up fixing more broken stuff in Sachi's room. Shiguto learns from Kyoko that Sachi is sick since her father died and, despite needing to leave, ends up visiting them daily with Sachi getting healthier. In time, Shiguto considers quitting his profession to stay with Sachi and Kyoko. But Kyoko witnessed him fighting Horror, Shiguto finds himself barred from visiting out of Kyoko's fear for her child's safety. This makes Sachi cry as Shiguto, understanding Kyoko's concern, leaves on good terms while giving Sachi and Kyoko his things to enjoy a day on the beach without him. In the aftermath of Garo: Makai no Hana, Crow confronts Eiji at the prison he has been placed in since the Eyrith incident. Crow requests Eiji's help to overcome his limits, using a technique to project themselves in a metaphysical dream to settle things in a duel. The two proceed to fight, with Eiji having the edge due to Crow's hesitation. But Crow manages to overcome the flaw while cutting down a phantom of Akari before striking down Eiji. Breaking out of the trance, Eiji congratulates Crow from getting strong while noting that his kindness is a double-edged sword. But Crow reveals he had an ulterior reason in the visit, explaining his deathblow had purged Crow of his inner darkness and bidding his mentor farewell with the hope they will fight as comrades next time.
9	"Greenhorn"; Transliteration: "Aonisai" (Japanese: 青二才)	June 3, 2016
Makai Priest Daichi has been training under Bikuu to be a Darkness Slasher, given a take by her to find three charms she placed around the town within a day or be disowned. After hours of searching each person for the last charm, getting a bloodied nose from a guy he offended, Daichi encounters a man named Hikaru striking a nymphomanic woman who is stalking him. Though told by Bikuu to not concern himself in the affairs of others, Daichi comes to Hikaru's aid as the woman is revealed to be a Horror's host. Though outmatched, Daichi attempts to hold the Horror at bay so Hikaru can escape before losing conscious as Raiga arrives. The Horror Antaeus assumes her true form with Raiga equipping the Garo armor to kill her. When Daichi comes to, he receives the last charm from Raiga as he reveals Bikuu's test was meant to test his determination to protect others. Daichi runs off to meet Bikuu with the hope to become a full-fledged Darkness Slasher.
10	"Unprecedented"; Transliteration: "Hatenkō" (Japanese: 破天荒)	June 10, 2016
Years before the events of Garo: Yami o Terasu Mono, spurred by a personal tragedy, Ryume arrives to the mountainside to master a powerful spell. However, as night falls a pair of thieves infiltrate a nearby tower told to be filled with Makai objects that they intend to sell off in the black market. Despite the building's worn-out appearance, the thieves find a chest and attempt to force it open. When one of the thieves ripped apart a sealing that was placed on the box, they have unknowingly released Horrors sealed in it. Ryume senses the chest opened and, placing her guards outside to ensure none escape, proceeds to fight Horrors while protecting the thieves. But when the Horrors gradually swarm around her and the thieves, spurred by the lead thief after he revealed himself to be a former Makai Priest and claims to have a protection spell, Ryume is forced to use the powerful spell to protect the thieves while obliterating the entire tower and everything in it. Though it appeared she ended up killing them, Ryume is relived that the thieves survived. The next day, after asking the lead thief why he lied to her, Ryume requests for the thieves to not be severely punished as the lead thief gives her his name: D Ringo. As D Ringo and his sidekick Ginji escape the guards, Ryume decides to establish herself in Line City to wipe out the Horrors that are thriving there.
11	"Sunlight and Shadow"; Transliteration: "Kagehinata" (Japanese: 陰日向)	June 17, 2016
Tsubasa arrives to the city to find a friend of his, having a series of misadventures from the culture shock. While at a bar, Tsubasa crosses paths with Jabi as she knows why is in the city and offers her assistance despite his refusal. After sunset, though it is not his jurisdiction, Tsubasa confronts a Horror-possessed salaryman who holds his prey hostage. Luckily, Jabi steps in to weaken the monster before Tsubasa finishes him off. Thanking Jabi while revealing the history he had with his friend before he moved to the city, Tsubasa requests her to no longer interfere. Tsubasa eventually finds his friend Kazuma, who is revealed to have become a Horror. Tsubasa engages Kazuma before Jabi arrives, welcoming her help before Kazuma assumes his true monstrous form and Tsubasa strikes him down. Later, despite Jabi assuming he came to confirm his friend's loss of humanity, Tsubasa explained he wanted to see if Kazuma retained his knight's pride while commenting on how powerful the darkness is to consume one like his friend who was like sunlight. But Jabi gives Tsubasa closure and a shoulder to cry on, becoming his traveling companion.
12	"Golden Monument"; Transliteration: "Kinjitō" (Japanese: 金字塔)	June 24, 2016
Deep within the area around the Tower of Heroic Spirits, Zaji is awakened by Eyrith who offers to grant his desire to destroy the line of Garo with her time manipulating powers. Within moments, Rekka and Rian are spirited away from their time periods as the two attempt to work together before ending up having a duel over who is the more skilled fighter. Their fight eventually attracts Zaji's attention as he felt Garo's light coming from them, making his presence known to the Makai Priestesses as they reveal themselves to be Garo's allies. Rekka reveals Zaji's identity to Rian as the fiend deems that they must die by his hand. Zaji proceeds to overpower the Makai Priestesses, knocking out Rekka before he attempts to kill her and Rian. But Zaji is destroyed by the sudden appearance a time displaced Kouga Saejima, who heals Rekka while explaining to Rian that she and Rekka will be returned to their rightful places. As Rekka comes to, Rian gives her Kouga's message that he shall return before they restored to their respective timelines.

== Theme songs ==
Opening theme

- "Garo ~Makai Retsuden~" (牙狼～魔戒烈伝～)
  - Composition & Arrangement: Yoshichika Kuriyama, Shiho Terada

Ending theme

- "Kagaribi no Yume" (篝火ノ夢; "Dream of Bonfire")
  - Lyrics: Masami Okui
  - Composition: Hironobu Kageyama
  - Arrangement: Yoshichika Kuriyama, Shiho Terada
  - Artist: Makai Kagekidan
