= Garo: Gold Storm Sho =

Japanese name
- Kanji: 牙狼〈GARO〉－GOLD STORM－ 翔
- Directed by: Keita Amemiya
- Written by: Norio Kida; Keita Amemiya
- Produced by: Yōsuke Hayashi; Kōichi Hirata
- Starring: Wataru Kuriyama; Masahiro Inoue
- Cinematography: Akira Nishioka
- Edited by: Tomoki Nagasaka
- Music by: Yoshichika Kuriyama; Shiho Terada
- Production company: Tohokushinsha Film
- Release date: March 28, 2015
- Running time: 82 minutes
- Country: Japan
- Language: Japanese

Garo: Gold Storm Sho
- Genre: Tokusatsu; Horror; Drama
- Created by: Keita Amemiya
- Based on: Garo
- Written by: Keita Amemiya; Kei Taguchi; Youko Izumisawa; Norio Kida; Kenichi Kanemaki; Sumiko Umeda; Junichi Fujisaku; Yoshinobu Kamo
- Directed by: Keita Amemiya; Akira Ohashi; Akihito Shimoda; Mitsuyoshi Abe; Yoshitaka Yamaguchi; Makoto Yokoyama; Yasuhiro Matsuda; Ikko Yamagishi
- Starring: Wataru Kuriyama; Miki Nanri; Masahiro Inoue; Miyavi Matsunoi; Shigeru Izumiya; Sakina Kuwae; Hiroki Nakajima; Tomohito Wakizaki
- Opening theme: "GOLD STORM" by JAM Project; "EMERGE ~Shikkoku no Tsubasa~" by JAM Project
- Ending theme: "PRAYERS" by Makai Kagekidan; "Guren Byakuren" by Makai Kagekidan
- Composers: Yoshichika Kuriyama, Shiho Terada
- Country of origin: Japan
- Original language: Japanese
- No. of episodes: 23 (list of episodes)

Production
- Executive producer: Kiyotaka Ninomiya
- Producer: Hirofumi Yamabe
- Running time: 24-25 minutes (per episode)
- Production company: Tohokushinsha Film

Original release
- Network: TX Network
- Release: April 3 – September 18, 2015

Related
- Garo: Makai no Hana; Garo: Makai Retsuden; GARO

Garo: Gold Storm Sho (牙狼〈GARO〉－GOLD STORM－ 翔, Garo Gōrudo Sutōmu Shō; lit. "Garo: Gold Storm Flight") is both a superhero film and the fifth television series in the Garo metaseries that serve as sequels to Garo: Yami o Terasu Mono. Wataru Kuriyama and Miki Nanri reprise their roles and are joined by new cast members which include Masahiro Inoue as the antagonist Jinga. The film prequel was released in theatres on March 28, 2015, while the television series began broadcast on April 3, 2015.

== Plot ==
Both the film and television series for Garo: Gold Storm Sho are direct sequels to Garo: Yami o Terasu Mono.

=== Film ===
Months after the events in Vol City, Ryuga Dogai has just slain the Horror Murado when he begins to suffer the effects of the accumulated evil energy within the armor. Rian luckily knows of a Makai Priestess in Line City that can purify the armor, searching the city while coming across a kebab stand owned by D Ringo. Ryuga and Rian eventually find the abode of Line City's resident Makai Priestess Ryume. Ryume takes the Garo armor from Ryuga to purify it over the course of two days, the Makai Knight assured that there are no Horrors within Line City to worry about. As Ryuga and Rian eat at D Ringo's stand, they see a painting that the owner explained to be of a statue of a guardian that mysteriously disappeared. When D Ringo's charm starts acting up, Zaruba senses an evil presence with the kebab owner revealing there are ruins near the city outskirts.

Ryuga and Rian come to the ruins to find a group of Makai Priests dead before being the figure responsible. The figure proceeds to overwhelm Ryuga and Rian before escaping them, with Ryuga finding an item that fell off him. The two return to Ryume, who reveals the object the figure stole is the forearm of the mad Horror Degol that she kept in check with her power. Parting ways with Rian to cover ground, Ryuga visits D Ringo who gives him an ancient Madou Tome detailing a Makai Priest named Sōtatsu who used his craftsmanship skills to create a humanoid Madōgu named Agō. Ryuga realizes that the figure is Agō as Rian finds him while in the middle of repairing himself. As Agō overpowers Rian, he explains his dream is a world without Horrors and came to the conclusion before taking his leave. After meeting up, Ryuga stopping Rian from hurting a petty thief who was working for Murado, the two discuss what they have learned about Agō before Zaruba senses a ki disruption across the city.

The two realize that Agō plans to use Ryume's means to keep Horrors from infesting Line City to wipe out everyone in the city with Degol's energies. But Agō had already defeated Ryume, with D-Ringo taking Ryuga and Rian to the central hub while providing them with Makai weapons he acquired from the black market. Fighting Ryuga as Rian frees Ryume, Agō reveals his goal to create a Horror-less world is by wiping out humanity itself. As their battle eventually comes to a highway, Ryuga explains that he and Rian share Agō's dream but refuses to acknowledge killing humans to achieve. It would be at that time that Degol awakens, revealing himself to be the Horror that killed Sōtatsu long ago as he consumes Agō's body to recreate his physical form. Luckily, Ryuga gains a purified and upgraded version of the Garo Armor so he can fight the Horror while reaching Agō. Finally understanding his creator's intention, Agō uses what strength he had left to restrain Dregor while giving Ryuga his weapon to destroy the Horror. Ryuga finds only a fragment of Agō, understanding the truth behind Agō's words but feels such a world without humans would be a tragedy. Later, after Ryume gives Zaruba an upgrade so they can seek her help, seeing D-Ringo on the way out, Ryuga and Rian leave.

=== Television series ===
After successfully saving Ryume and stopping Agō, Ryuga and Rian are assigned under her as guardians of Line City as they investigate a mysterious increase in Horror activity in the area. This is all a plot by fallen Makai Knight Jinga and his wife Makai Priestess Amily, who have since become Horrors years ago as a result of giving into his darkness following the death of their son, to raise the ancient weapon Radan to destroy humanity. To stop them, Ryuga and Rian team up with Daigo Akizuki, Giga the Beast Knight, and the Makai Priests Gald and Haruna, as well as D Ringo and Yukihime before the two Horrors can succeed in their plans.

== Cast ==
- Ryuga Dougai (道外 流牙, Dōgai Ryūga): Wataru Kuriyama (栗山 航, Kuriyama Wataru)
- Rian (莉杏): Miki Nanri (南里 美希, Nanri Miki)
- Ryume (リュメ): Sakina Kuwae (桑江 咲菜, Kuwae Sakina)
- D Ringo (D・リンゴ): Shigeru Izumiya (泉谷 しげる, Izumiya Shigeru)
- Yukihime (ユキヒメ): Momoko Kuroki (黒木 桃子, Kuroki Momoko)
- Raiji (雷侍; Movie), Fuji (風侍, Fūji; Series): Hiroto Tanaka (田中 大登, Tanaka Hiroto)
- Madō Ring Zaruba (魔導輪ザルバ, Madōrin Zaruba; Voice): Hironobu Kageyama (影山 ヒロノブ, Kageyama Hironobu)

=== Movie cast ===
- Agō (阿号): Shunya Isaka (井坂 俊哉, Isaka Shun'ya)
- Priest Sōtatsu (双竜法師, Sōtatsu Hōshi): Akira Emoto (柄本 明, Emoto Akira)
- Fuji: Minoru Tomita (富田 稔, Tomita Minoru)
- Murado (ムラド): Kazuya Shimizu (清水 一哉, Shimizu Kazuya)
- Fukaya (フカヤ): Tsune (ツネ; of 2700)
- Okabe (オカベ): Hiroyuki Yasoshima (八十島 弘行, Yasoshima Hiroyuki; of 2700)
- Little girl: Alicia Mitsui (三井 アリーシア, Mitsui Arīshia)
- Old woman: Kazue Tsunogae (角替 和枝, Tsunogae Kazue)
- Truck driver: Kunihiro Matsumura (松村 邦洋, Matsumura Kunihiro)
- Degol (デゴル, Degoru; Voice), Horror (ホラー, Horā; Voice): Rintarō Nishi (西 凛太朗, Nishi Rintarō)
- Ryume (Voice): Yu Mizuno (水野 ゆふ, Mizuno Yū)
- Fuji (Voice): Masaomi Yamahashi (山橋 正臣, Yamahashi Masaomi)
- Raiji (Voice): Takahiro Fujitaka (藤高 智大, Fujitaka Takahiro)
- Little girl (Voice): Eri Ōzeki (大関 英里, Ōzeki Eri)

=== Series cast ===
- Jinga (ジンガ): Masahiro Inoue (井上 正大, Inoue Masahiro)
- Amily (アミリ, Amiri): Miyavi Matsunoi (松野井 雅, Matsunoi Miyabi)
- Gald (ガルド, Garudo): Hiroki Nakajima (中島 広稀, Nakajima Hiroki)
- Daigo Akizuki (秋月 ダイゴ, Akizuki Daigo): Tomohito Wakizaki (脇崎 智史, Wakizaki Tomohito)
- Haruna (ハルナ): Moka Komatsu (小松 もか, Komatsu Moka)
- Raiji: Daiki Suzuki (鈴木 大樹, Suzuki Daiki)

== Episodes ==
No.	Title	Writer	Original release date
Movie	"Garo: Gold Storm Sho"; Transliteration: "GARO -GOLD STORM- Shō" (Japanese: 牙狼＜GARO＞－GOLD STORM－翔)	Norio Kida; Keita Amemiya	March 28, 2015
SP	"Garo: Gold Storm Sho Begins! The Golden Storm Special"; Transliteration: "GARO -GOLD STORM- Shō Makiokose! Konjiki no Arashi Supesharu" (Japanese: 牙狼＜GARO＞－GOLD STORM－翔 巻き起こせ！金色の嵐スペシャル)	Unknown	April 3, 2015
1	"Sword"; Transliteration: "Tsurugi" (Japanese: 剣)	Keita Amemiya	April 10, 2015
2	"Flame"; Transliteration: "Honō" (Japanese: 炎)	Kei Taguchi	April 17, 2015
3	"Butterfly"; Transliteration: "Chō" (Japanese: 蝶)	Youko Izumisawa	April 24, 2015
4	"Axe"; Transliteration: "Ono" (Japanese: 斧)	Kei Taguchi	May 1, 2015
5	"Sin"; Transliteration: "Tsumi" (Japanese: 罪)	Norio Kida	May 8, 2015
6	"Frame"; Transliteration: "Gaku" (Japanese: 額)	Kenichi Kanemaki; Kei Taguchi	May 15, 2015
7	"Spell"; Transliteration: "Jutsu" (Japanese: 術)	Kei Taguchi	May 22, 2015
8	"Brush"; Transliteration: "Fude" (Japanese: 筆)	Kei Taguchi	June 5, 2015
9	"Feathers"; Transliteration: "Hane" (Japanese: 羽)	Kei Taguchi; Sumiko Umeda	June 12, 2015
10	"Thunder"; Transliteration: "Ikazuchi" (Japanese: 雷)	Kei Taguchi	June 19, 2015
11	"Trap"; Transliteration: "Wana" (Japanese: 罠)	Sumiko Umeda	June 26, 2015
12	"Bonds"; Transliteration: "Kizuna" (Japanese: 絆)	Sumiko Umeda	July 3, 2015
13	"Swamp"; Transliteration: "Numa" (Japanese: 沼)	Kenichi Kanemaki; Kei Taguchi	July 10, 2015
14	"Signpost"; Transliteration: "Shirube" (Japanese: 標)	Kei Taguchi	July 17, 2015
15	"Fort"; Transliteration: "Toride" (Japanese: 砦)	Junichi Fujisaku	July 24, 2015
16	"War"; Transliteration: "Ikusa" (Japanese: 戦)	Junichi Fujisaku	July 31, 2015
17	"Mirror"; Transliteration: "Kagami" (Japanese: 鏡)	Kei Taguchi	August 7, 2015
18	"Darkness"; Transliteration: "Yami" (Japanese: 闇)	Kei Taguchi	August 14, 2015
19	"Heart"; Transliteration: "Kokoro" (Japanese: 心)	Youko Izumisawa	August 21, 2015
20	"Fountain"; Transliteration: "Izumi" (Japanese: 泉)	Yoshinobu Kamo	August 28, 2015
21	"King"; Transliteration: "Ō" (Japanese: 王)	Yoshinobu Kamo	September 4, 2015
22	"Castle"; Transliteration: "Shiro" (Japanese: 城)	Keita Amemiya	September 11, 2015
23	"Storm"; Transliteration: "Arashi" (Japanese: 嵐)	Keita Amemiya	September 18, 2015

== Theme songs ==
=== Movie ===
Opening theme

- "Opening Theme of ~GOLD STORM Sho~" (Opening Theme of ～GOLD STORM 翔～, Opening Theme of ~GOLD STORM Shō~)
  - Composition & Arrangement: Shiho Terada, Yoshichika Kuriyama
  - Artist: Masami Okui, Hiroshi Kitadani, Yoshiki Fukuyama

Ending theme

- "GOLD STORM Sho ~The Ending Theme~" (GOLD STORM 翔 ～The Ending Theme～, GOLD STORM Shō ~The Ending Theme~)
  - Composition: Hironobu Kageyama, Shiho Terada, Yoshichika Kuriyama
  - Arrangement: Shiho Terada

=== Series ===
Opening themes

- "GOLD STORM"
  - Composition & Arrangement: Shiho Terada, Yoshichika Kuriyama
  - Artist: JAM Project
  - Episodes: 1-12
- "EMERGE ~Shikkoku no Tsubasa~" (EMERGE ～漆黒の翼～; "EMERGE ~Black Wings~")
  - Lyrics: Masami Okui
  - Composition: Hironobu Kageyama
  - Arrangement: Kenichi Sudō
  - Artist: JAM Project
  - Episodes: 13-22

Ending themes

- "PRAYERS"
  - Lyrics: Masami Okui
  - Composition: Hironobu Kageyama
  - Arrangement: Shiho Terada
  - Artist: Makai Kagekidan (魔戒歌劇団)
    - YUKIHIME: Momoko Kuroki
    - RYUME: Sakina Kuwae
    - REKKA: Mary Matsuyama
    - ANNA: Eri Ōzeki
  - Produced by team GAJARI (Hironobu Kageyama, Masami Okui, Keita Amemiya)
  - Episodes: 1-12
- "Guren Byakuren" (紅蓮白蓮; "Crimson Lotus, White Lotus")
  - Lyrics: Masami Okui
  - Composition: Hironobu Kageyama
  - Arrangement: Hijiri Anze
  - Artist: Makai Kagekidan
  - Episodes: 13-23
