= Garo: Makai no Hana =

2014 Japanese TV drama

- Promotional poster featuring Raiga Saejima (Masei Nakayama)
- Genre: Tokusatsu; Horror; Drama; Superhero
- Created by: Keita Amemiya
- Based on: Garo
- Written by: Keita Amemiya; Hisako Fujihira; Kei Taguchi; Itaru Era; Yūdai Yamaguchi; Norio Kida; Sumiko Umeda; Yūsuke Kawanami
- Directed by: Keita Amemiya; Mitsuyoshi Abe; Yūdai Yamaguchi; Makoto Yokoyama; Yasuhiro Matsuda; Ryu Kaneda; Akihito Shimoda; Shigeyuki Nakagawa; Jubei Ino; Yoshiomi Umetsu; Akira Ohashi; Kei Era
- Starring: Masei Nakayama; Natsumi Ishibashi; Atomu Mizuishi
- Opening theme: "Garo -Makai no Hana-" by Masaaki Endoh, Masami Okui, and Hiroshi Kitadani; "Raiga ~Tusk of thunder~" by JAM Project
- Ending theme: "Yasashisa no Tsubomi" by Faylan; "my memory, your memory" by JAM Project
- Composer: Shunji Inoue
- Country of origin: Japan
- Original language: Japanese
- No. of episodes: 25 (list of episodes)

Production
- Executive producer: Kiyotaka Ninomiya
- Producer: Kanako Natsui
- Running time: 24-25 minutes (per episode)
- Production company: Tohokushinsha Film

Original release
- Network: TX Network
- Release: April 4 – September 26, 2014

Related
- Garo: Yami o Terasu Mono; Garo: Goldstorm Sho; GARO

Garo: Makai no Hana (牙狼〈GARO〉－魔戒ノ花－; "Garo: The Makai Flower") is a 2014 Japanese tokusatsu television drama. It is the fourth television series in the Garo metaseries, this time focusing on the character of Raiga Saejima, the son of the original protagonist Kouga, who takes on the mantle of the Golden Knight Garo. The series began broadcast on April 4, 2014, on TV Tokyo and its sister stations in the TX Network.

== Plot ==
The story continues after the events of Garo: Makai Senki, P Garo: Saejima Kouga (mini-series), and Garo: Makai Retsuden. Kouga and Kaoru got married and had a son, Raiga Saejima. Kouga's journey as Garo has ended and Raiga has now succeeded him as the next golden knight.

=== Prologue ===
Approximately 20 years ago, two major events would happen that would bring about the convergence of two knights: the disappearance of Raiga's parents and the death of a Makai Priestess. When Raiga was 6 years old, Kouga and Kaoru had a family outing when an inter-dimensional portal opened and took away Kaoru. Unwilling to lose his wife, Kouga decided to jump through the portal as well. Kouga promised Raiga he will find Kaoru and return home one day.

Separate from events, a pregnant Makai Priestess was attacked by a Horror and was being possessed. Unwilling to allow her baby to be devoured, the priestess endowed her child with the power to seal Horrors. While her mother died, the baby lived and the priests would realize the infant has a darkness vault inside of her. Priest Shidou would name her Mayuri and placed magical spells upon her to protect Mayuri from her container becoming unstable. Treated only as a Madōgu, she is sealed away and placed in slumber unless needed to seal unique dark entities.

About 4 years after Kouga's disappearance, Raiga would resolve to train himself as the next Garo. It was around this time that he would encounter Priestess Akari, the lover to Eiji Busujima (Senatorial Makai Knight, Giru the Heretic Bone Knight, and leader of the Shadowfolk Makai Knights). Although a brief meeting, Raiga gave Akari a bell that represented a sound of light. Sadly, Akari would die not long. Suffering from a terminal disease, Eiji watched as Akari faded away. Unwilling to let her go, Eiji accessed Mayuri and placed Akari's soul within Mayuri's container until he can figure a means to bring back her body. He believes if he can reunite Akari's soul and body together, he can resurrect her. However, it wouldn't happen for years to come.

Upon Raiga's 10th birthday, Rei Suzumura arrived to fulfill his promise to Kouga. Rei promised to train Raiga to become a Makai Knight if he doesn't return. After verifying his resolve, Zero accepted Raiga as his disciple and made him a full fledged knight. After all of his trials, Raiga entered the Tower of Heroic Spirits (the tower that houses the Garo armor) to earn the right to succeed as the next Garo. To his surprise, the heroic spirits denied him the armor because Kouga still wears it. Shocked to realize his father still lives, the spirits told him Kouga relinquishes the armor to him and allows Raiga to begin his journey as the next Garo.

=== Main Story ===
The story begins with Eiji Busujima, breaking into a museum. Eiji learned that civilians discovered the stone slab that sealed the Horror Eyrith and mistook it as an ancient relic. Eyrith is known to bring back the dead; Eiji was hoping to use Eyrith's power to resurrect Akari. The slab itself are the collection of 9 Horrors that were used to help contain Eyrith; Eiji broke the seal and unleashed the Ady Slate Horrors just to get to Eyrith. Even though the seal is broken, Eyrith will only appear when the last Ady Slate Horror is captured; he goes into hiding and waits to strike.

Raiga has been assigned to teamed up with Mayuri and Shadowfolk Makai Knight Crow to find all the Ady Slate Horrors and re-seal Eyrith. As the team reached to the last Ady Slate Horror, Eiji reappears and kidnaps both the Horror and Mayuri to enact his plan. Exposing Eyrith, Eiji negotiates reviving Akari in exchange for Eyrith's revival. Taking a lock of Akari's hair as a genetic template, Eyrith cloned a body of Akari and Eiji planned to open Mayuri's container to restore Akari when Raiga and Crow intervened.

While Garo fought against Giru, Crow attempted to save Mayuri. Eyrith planned to possess Mayuri but Crow offered himself in exchange for her safety. Taking over Crow's body, Eyrith appeared before Raiga and Eiji. She destroyed Akari's cloned body and flew away; everything that Eiji had planned for is ruined. Raiga gave chase as Crow flew away to a pond to bloom. Without any need for Crow, Eyrith left Crow's body and began sprouting herself into a massive demonic tree.

Garo attempted to stop Eyrith and faced her true form within the tree. It has been revealed Eyrith was responsible for opening various portals through time and space, including the portal that took away his parents. Eyrith tried to tempt Raiga to save his parents, but he resisted. While fighting Garo, Eyrith managed to accelerate the armor's time limit. Losing control, Garo became Lost Soul Beast Garo and begun rampaging towards his own allies. It was while rampaging that Raiga heard the same bell he had given Akari all those years ago and it helped him come to his senses. He overcame the Lost Soul Beast state and became Light Awakening Beast Garo to slay Eyrith. With Eyrith weakened, Raiga had Mayuri seal Eyrith back into the stone slab. Although the day seemed to be victorious, Mayuri's well-being is in danger.

Mayuri's container is temperamental and can be affected by her thoughts and emotions; Priest Shidou's magical safety precautions includes her going back to slumber whenever a mission is over and lose all memory of it. Because she got in touch with her humanity during her time with Raiga, Mayuri doesn't want to forget nor lose the bonds she has created. Because of her resistance, her container has become corrupted and could kill her. To save Mayuri's life, Raiga entered her spirit and destroyed the container within her. After several days of rest, Mayuri awakened with her memories intact and Raiga smiled back in joy. This would begin a new chapter for the both of them and their story continues through Garo: Makai Retsuden and Garo: Gekkou no Tabibito.

== Cast ==
- Raiga Saejima (冴島 雷牙, Saejima Raiga): Masei Nakayama (中山 麻聖, Nakayama Masei)
- Mayuri (マユリ): Natsumi Ishibashi (石橋 菜津美, Ishibashi Natsumi)
- Crow (クロウ, Kurō): Atomu Mizuishi (水石 亜飛夢, Mizuishi Atomu)
- Gonza Kurahashi (倉橋 ゴンザ, Kurahashi Gonza): Yukijirō Hotaru (螢 雪次朗, Hotaru Yukijirō)
- Jiiru (ジイル): Asana Mamoru (護 あさな, Mamoru Asana)
- Bikuu (媚空, Bikū): Sayaka Akimoto (秋元 才加, Akimoto Sayaka)
- Shidou (四道, Shidō): Ren Osugi (大杉 漣, Ōsugi Ren)
- Eiji Busujima (毒島 エイジ, Busujima Eiji): Show Aikawa (哀川 翔, Aikawa Shō)
- Madō Ring Zaruba (魔導輪ザルバ, Madōrin Zaruba; Voice): Hironobu Kageyama (影山 ヒロノブ, Kageyama Hironobu)
- Madō Brooch Orva (魔導具オルヴァ, Madōgu Oruva; Voice): Eri Ōzeki (大関 英里, Ōzeki Eri)

== Episodes ==
No.	Title	Written by	Original release date
1	"Fossil"; Transliteration: "Kaseki" (Japanese: 化石)	Keita Amemiya	April 4, 2014
2	"Pests"; Transliteration: "Gaichū" (Japanese: 害虫)	Keita Amemiya; Hisako Fujihira	April 11, 2014
3	"Greenhouse"; Transliteration: "Onshitsu" (Japanese: 温室)	Hisako Fujihira; Kei Taguchi	April 18, 2014
4	"Movie"; Transliteration: "Eiga" (Japanese: 映画)	Itaru Era; Yūdai Yamaguchi	April 25, 2014
5	"Star Chart"; Transliteration: "Seizu" (Japanese: 星図)	Norio Kida	May 2, 2014
6	"Wind Chimes"; Transliteration: "Fūrin" (Japanese: 風鈴)	Sumiko Umeda	May 9, 2014
7	"Myth"; Transliteration: "Shinwa" (Japanese: 神話)	Keita Amemiya; Itaru Era	May 16, 2014
8	"Family"; Transliteration: "Kazoku" (Japanese: 家族)	Hisako Fujihira	May 23, 2014
9	"Raising"; Transliteration: "Shiiku" (Japanese: 飼育)	Sumiko Umeda; Keita Amemiya	May 30, 2014
10	"Dinner Table"; Transliteration: "Shokutaku" (Japanese: 食卓)	Kei Taguchi	June 6, 2014
11	"Manga"; Transliteration: "Manga" (Japanese: 漫画)	Yūsuke Kawanami; Kei Taguchi	June 13, 2014
12	"Word Spirit"; Transliteration: "Kotodama" (Japanese: 言霊)	Keita Amemiya	June 20, 2014
13	"Ferocious Beast"; Transliteration: "Kyōjū" (Japanese: 凶獣)	Kei Taguchi	June 27, 2014
14	"Transformation"; Transliteration: "Henshin" (Japanese: 変身)	Sumiko Umeda	July 11, 2014
15	"Tea"; Transliteration: "Kōcha" (Japanese: 紅茶)	Kei Taguchi	July 18, 2014
16	"Scream"; Transliteration: "Zekkyō" (Japanese: 絶叫)	Hisako Fujihira; Keita Amemiya	July 25, 2014
17	"The Boy"; Transliteration: "Shōnen" (Japanese: 少年)	Keita Amemiya; Itaru Era	August 1, 2014
18	"Crimson Lotus"; Transliteration: "Guren" (Japanese: 紅蓮)	Itaru Era	August 8, 2014
19	"Suite"; Transliteration: "Kumikyoku" (Japanese: 組曲)	Sumiko Umeda	August 15, 2014
20	"Tetsujin"; Transliteration: "Tetsujin" (Japanese: 鉄人)	Norio Kida; Keita Amemiya	August 22, 2014
21	"Afterimage"; Transliteration: "Zanzō" (Japanese: 残像)	Sumiko Umeda	August 29, 2014
22	"Guard Dog"; Transliteration: "Banken" (Japanese: 番犬)	Itaru Era; Keita Amemiya	September 5, 2014
23	"Reminiscence"; Transliteration: "Tsuisō" (Japanese: 追想)	Itaru Era; Keita Amemiya	September 12, 2014
24	"Marebito"; Transliteration: "Marebito" (Japanese: 稀人)	Keita Amemiya	September 19, 2014
25	"Destiny"; Transliteration: "Tenmei" (Japanese: 天命)	Keita Amemiya	September 26, 2014

On April 4, 2014, TV Tokyo broadcast a special program titled Garo: Makai no Hana New Legend Special (牙狼〈GARO〉-魔戒ノ花- 新たなる伝説スペシャル, Garo Makai no Hana Aratanaru Densetsu Supesharu).

== Theme songs ==
Opening themes

- "Garo -Makai no Hana-" (牙狼〈GARO〉 -魔戒ノ花-)
  - Composition & Arrangement: Shiho Terada, Yoshichika Kuriyama, Yoichi Matsuo
  - Artist: Masaaki Endoh, Masami Okui, Hiroshi Kitadani
- "Raiga ~Tusk of thunder~" (雷牙 ～Tusk of thunder～)
  - Lyrics & Composition: Hironobu Kageyama
  - Arrangement: Kenichi Sudō
  - Artist: JAM Project

Ending themes

- "Yasashisa no Tsubomi" (優しさの蕾; "Flower Bud of Kindness")
  - Composition: Noriyasu Agematsu (Elements Garden)
  - Arrangement: Evan Call (Elements Garden)
  - Lyrics & Artist: Faylan
- "my memory, your memory"
  - Lyrics & Composition: Masami Okui
  - Arrangement: Shiho Terada, Yoshichika Kuriyama
  - Artist: JAM Project
