= List of Garo: Gold Storm Sho episodes =

This is a list of episodes of the 2015 Japanese tokusatsu television series Garo: Gold Storm Sho, the direct sequel to 2013's Garo: Yami o Terasu Mono which is itself a spinoff of 2005 & 2006's Garo.

== Episodes ==
No.	Title	Writer	Original release date
Movie	"Garo: Gold Storm Sho"; Transliteration: "GARO -GOLD STORM- Shō" (Japanese: 牙狼＜GARO＞－GOLD STORM－翔)	Norio Kida; Keita Amemiya	March 28, 2015
SP	"Garo: Gold Storm Sho Begins! The Golden Storm Special"; Transliteration: "GARO -GOLD STORM- Shō Makiokose! Konjiki no Arashi Supesharu" (Japanese: 牙狼＜GARO＞－GOLD STORM－翔 巻き起こせ！金色の嵐スペシャル)	Unknown	April 3, 2015
1	"Sword"; Transliteration: "Tsurugi" (Japanese: 剣)	Keita Amemiya	April 10, 2015
2	"Flame"; Transliteration: "Honō" (Japanese: 炎)	Kei Taguchi	April 17, 2015
3	"Butterfly"; Transliteration: "Chō" (Japanese: 蝶)	Youko Izumisawa	April 24, 2015
4	"Axe"; Transliteration: "Ono" (Japanese: 斧)	Kei Taguchi	May 1, 2015
5	"Sin"; Transliteration: "Tsumi" (Japanese: 罪)	Norio Kida	May 8, 2015
6	"Frame"; Transliteration: "Gaku" (Japanese: 額)	Kenichi Kanemaki; Kei Taguchi	May 15, 2015
7	"Spell"; Transliteration: "Jutsu" (Japanese: 術)	Kei Taguchi	May 22, 2015
8	"Brush"; Transliteration: "Fude" (Japanese: 筆)	Kei Taguchi	June 5, 2015
9	"Feathers"; Transliteration: "Hane" (Japanese: 羽)	Kei Taguchi; Sumiko Umeda	June 12, 2015
10	"Thunder"; Transliteration: "Ikazuchi" (Japanese: 雷)	Kei Taguchi	June 19, 2015
11	"Trap"; Transliteration: "Wana" (Japanese: 罠)	Sumiko Umeda	June 26, 2015
12	"Bonds"; Transliteration: "Kizuna" (Japanese: 絆)	Sumiko Umeda	July 3, 2015
13	"Swamp"; Transliteration: "Numa" (Japanese: 沼)	Kenichi Kanemaki; Kei Taguchi	July 10, 2015
14	"Signpost"; Transliteration: "Shirube" (Japanese: 標)	Kei Taguchi	July 17, 2015
15	"Fort"; Transliteration: "Toride" (Japanese: 砦)	Junichi Fujisaku	July 24, 2015
16	"War"; Transliteration: "Ikusa" (Japanese: 戦)	Junichi Fujisaku	July 31, 2015
17	"Mirror"; Transliteration: "Kagami" (Japanese: 鏡)	Kei Taguchi	August 7, 2015
18	"Darkness"; Transliteration: "Yami" (Japanese: 闇)	Kei Taguchi	August 14, 2015
19	"Heart"; Transliteration: "Kokoro" (Japanese: 心)	Youko Izumisawa	August 21, 2015
20	"Fountain"; Transliteration: "Izumi" (Japanese: 泉)	Yoshinobu Kamo	August 28, 2015
21	"King"; Transliteration: "Ō" (Japanese: 王)	Yoshinobu Kamo	September 4, 2015
22	"Castle"; Transliteration: "Shiro" (Japanese: 城)	Keita Amemiya	September 11, 2015
23	"Storm"; Transliteration: "Arashi" (Japanese: 嵐)	Keita Amemiya	September 18, 2015
