= Ghost Killer =

- Film poster
- Directed by: Kensuke Sonomura
- Written by: Yugo Sakamoto
- Produced by: Doris Pfardrescher; Yūsuke Suzuki; Hiroyuki Takase; Kotaro Fujiyama; Riku Tsunoda; Eiichi Sugaya
- Starring: Akari Takaishi; Mario Kuroba; Masanori Mimoto
- Cinematography: Moritada Iju
- Edited by: Kensuke Sonomura; Takehiko Tsunekawa
- Music by: Nobuhiko Morino
- Production companies: Rights Cube; MINY MIX CREATIVE; TV Tokyo; TRUSTAR
- Distributed by: Well Go USA Entertainment (US)
- Release dates: September 19, 2024 (Fantastic Fest); April 11, 2025 (Japan)
- Running time: 105 minutes
- Country: Japan
- Language: Japanese

Ghost Killer (Japanese: ゴーストキラー, Hepburn: Gōsuto Kirā) is a 2024 Japanese action comedy fantasy film directed by Kensuke Sonomura. The story follows a teenager who becomes connected to the ghost of a hitman and finds herself entangled in the man's dangerous past.

== Cast ==
- Akari Takaishi as Fumika Matsuoka
- Mario Kuroba as Riku Kagehara
- Masanori Mimoto as Hideo Kudo
- Ayaka Higashino as Maho Iida
- Hidenobu Abera as Masaki Katayama
- Naoto Kuratomi as Narumi
- Satoshi Kibe as Katsushige
- Ryu Ichinose as Ryūsuke
- Naohiro Kawamoto as Masaharu Katsura
- Inoue Sora as Shungo Honda
- Yasukaze Motomiya
- Yoshiyuki Yamaguchi
- Yoshimi Tachi
- Takashi Kitadai
- Tatsuya Nakazawa
- Hiroto Honda
- Kenta Kawasaki

== Background and development ==
Prior to making Ghost Killer, Yugo Sakamoto and Kensuke Sonomura worked together on the Baby Assassins film and television series of action comedies, with Sakamoto scripting and directing and Sonomura handling the action. For Ghost Killer, Sonomura took over as the director while Sakamoto scripted the film. The lead actress is Akari Takaishi who also appeared in the Baby Assassins franchise.

== Release ==
Ghost Killer premiered at the 2024 Fantastic Fest. It later played at other film festivals, including Beyond Fest, Sitges International Fantastic Film Festival, and Mar del Plata Film Festival. It was released on April 11, 2025 in Japan.

== Reception ==
Mark Schilling of The Japan Times said that the film land gags solidly and that its action scenes were brought together with a high level of skill. However, Schilling also wrote that the various plot turns were "all-too familiar, if not quite AI-generated dreck."

James Perkins of Starburst complimented the fight choreography as being "refreshingly tangible. Rather than burying everything under frantic editing, the camera actually lets performers move", which he concluded as giving it "flashes of the balletic brutality of John Wick, but with scrappier, more playful energy." Perkins found that what elevated Ghost Killer was its "unexpected humanity". He stated that, "The relationship between Fumika and Kudo shifts from revenge to a closer understanding", and that the film "even slips in a light but pointed commentary on toxic masculinity and social apathy."

Leslie Felperin of The Guardian commented that the film felt "targeted more at a masc-centric audience", but complimented that Sakamoto's script hinges on key scenes where women's right to not be degraded and injured by men are championed. The review also complimented that Fumika spends most of the film in tracksuit trousers, a puffer coat and a knitted beanie instead of "some kind of nymphet-adjacent outfit designed to titillate viewers."

== Remake ==
In 2025, producer Doris Pfardrescher announced the decision to remake Ghost Killer as an English language movie "to let more audiences enjoy the unique fusion of stylish action and high-concept storytelling".
