= Saori Izawa =

Japanese actress (born 1994)

- 伊澤彩織
- Born: February 16, 1994 (age 32); Saitama Prefecture, Japan
- Education: Nihon University College of Art [ja]
- Occupations: Actress, Stunt performer
- Years active: 2016-present
- Notable work: Baby Assassins; Baby Assassins Everyday!

Saori Izawa (Japanese: 伊澤彩織, Hepburn: Izawa Saori; born February 16, 1994) is a Japanese actress and stunt performer, known for her role as Mahiro Fukagawa in the Baby Assassins film series.

== Biography ==
Izawa was born in Saitama Prefecture, Japan, on February 16, 1994. She graduated from the Department of Film Studies at Nihon University of Art _{[ja]} in Tokyo.

In 2016, Izawa auditioned and was accepted as an action trainee for the movie RE:BORN (2017). After that, she started performing stunts in Japanese films such as Rurouni Kenshin: The Beginning (2021) and Rurouni Kenshin: The Final (2021), as well as international films like Snake Eyes: G.I. Joe Origins (2021) and John Wick: Chapter 4 (2023).

Izawa made her film debut as an actress in A Janitor (2021), where she and Akari Takaishi played small parts as teenage assassins. Due to the popularity of the duo's scenes, director Yugo Sakamoto set out to write a new action comedy film about the life of a pair of female assassins. The movie Baby Assassins, starring Izawa and Takaishi, premiered in 2021 to great success and became the first of a series of films. Both Izawa and Takaishi reprised their roles as Mahiro Fukagawa and Chisato Sugimoto in the sequels Baby Assassins: 2 Babies (2023) and Baby Assassins: Nice Days (2024), as well as the TV series Baby Assassins Everyday! (2024).

In 2025, Izawa was set to play Yuasa Gosuke as part of the cast for the non-verbal stage play The battle of Sekigahara (礎の響～SEKIGAHARA～). However, she withdrew from the production shortly before the premiere, citing health issues.

== Filmography ==
=== Film ===
Year	Title	Role	Notes	Ref
2017	RE:BORN	Office lady killer		
2017	Manhunt	Utility Stunts		
2019	Kingdom	Stunts		
2021	Rurouni Kenshin: The Beginning	Stunts		
2021	Rurouni Kenshin: The Final	Stunts		
2021	Snake Eyes: G.I. Joe Origins	Stunts		
2021	A Janitor	Shiho		
2021	Baby Assassins	Mahiro Fukagawa	Lead role	
2022	First Mission	White		
2022	Okamuro-san	Sawara Ayako		
2023	Baby Assassins: 2 Babies	Mahiro Fukagawa	Lead role	
2023	John Wick: Chapter 4	Stunt double for Akira Shimazu (Rina Sawayama) / Osaka Continental Assassin		
2023	Almost people	One		
2023	Nemesis: The Mystery of the Golden Spiral	Assassin		
2024	Baby Assassins: Nice Days	Mahiro Fukagawa	Lead role	
2024	Documentary of Baby Assassins	Herself	Documentary	
2024	The Gesuidouz _{[}_{ja]}	Moe Katamoto		
2024	City Hunter	Stunts		
2025	Scarlet	Action performer (motion reference for character of Scarlet)	Animated Film	

=== Short films ===
Year	Title	Role	Notes	Ref
2020	姉妹 (sisters)		Part of the short film anthology: Ami Ikenaga _{[}_{ja]} and seven action directors.	
2022	Heaven's Rush		Directed by Yugo Sakamoto_{[}_{j}_{a].}	
2024	Yours			
2025	Sukajan Kung Fu	Etsuko		

=== Television ===
Year	Title	Role	Notes	Ref
2019	Little Dora (ちょいドラ)	Akeko	Segment: "The woman who kills"	
2022	Alice in Borderland	Stunts	8 episodes - Season 2	
2024	Baby Assassins Everyday!	Mahiro Fukagawa	12 episodes	
2025	THE オファー (The offer) _{[ja]}	Herself	2 episodes	

=== Web ===
Year	Title	Role	Notes	Ref
2021	Mashin Sentai Kiramager Spin-Off: Yodonna	Yanako Nishinoura		
2021	Mashin Sentai Kiramager Spin-Off: Yodonna 2	Yanako Nishinoura		

=== Commercials ===
Year	Title	Role	Notes	Ref
2023	Monster Hunter Now: Survival Dance	Fighter with sword		
2024	Sakamoto Days Special Live-Action PV Vol. 18 Release	Store clerk		
2024	スキップ・ビート！Skip Beat! Vol. 50 Release	Saori		
2026	Amazon Japan: Every day goes around. Two samurai.	Samurai / Actress		

=== Music videos ===
Year	Artist	Title	Role	Notes	Ref
2017	Shiena Nishizawa	Break your fate			
2020	raciku	高鳴り(Samurai girl)		Also model for the single's cover image.	
2022	The Dresscodes	「聖者」			
2023	AIMI	MAGICAL DESTROYER			
2023	Creep Hyp	「青梅」		Directed by Yugo Sakamoto_{[}_{j}_{a].}	
2023	Original God	BDSM PSYCHEDELIC DEATH WARRANT			
2023	tofubeats	I CAN FEEL IT			
2025	Hoshimachi Suisei	ビーナスバグ (VENUS BUG)			
2025	SIRUP	UNDERCOVER			
2025	CROWN HEAD	「鬼灯」			
2025	ExWhyZ	リグレット (REGRET)			
2026	yonige	「芽吹くとき」			

== Video games ==
Year	Title	Role	Notes	Ref
2019	Marvel Ultimate Alliance 3: The Black Order	Motion capture artist		
2020	Yakuza: Like a Dragon	Battle actor		
2022	Xenoblade Chronicles 3	Stunt coordinator assistant		
2022	Xenoblade Chronicles 3: Expansion Pass	Motion capture support		
2024	Granblue Fantasy: Relink	Motion actor		
2024	Final Fantasy VII: Rebirth	Cutscene - Additional actor		
2024	Rise of the Rōnin	Motion capture artist		
2024	Kunitsu-Gami: Path of the Goddess	Motion capture action coordinator		

== Radio ==
Year	Title	Role	Notes	Ref
2025 - present	Artistspoken: Eve Sketch	Herself		

== Stage ==
Year	Title	Role	Notes	Ref
2024	SaGa: The Stage - Bond of Rebirth	Madeleine/Real Queen Calamity	Double role	

== Publications ==
Year	Title	Role	Notes	Ref
2026	PLAYer 1 伊澤彩織PHOTO BOOK	Author	ISBN 978-4-04-116826-4	

== Awards and nominations ==
Year	Award	Category	Nominated work	Result	Ref
2022	Japanese Movie Critics Awards	New Actress (Kazuko Komori Award)	Baby Assassins	Won	
2024	Screen Actors Guild Awards	Outstanding Performance by a Stunt Ensemble in a Motion Picture	John Wick: Chapter 4	Nominated	
