= List of Garo: Makai no Hana episodes =

This is a list of episodes of the 2014 Japanese tokusatsu television series Garo: Makai no Hana, the sequel to 2005 & 2006's Garo.

== Episodes ==
No.	Title	Written by	Original release date
1	"Fossil"; Transliteration: "Kaseki" (Japanese: 化石)	Keita Amemiya	April 4, 2014
Ages ago, an evil Demon Beast known as Eyrith was sealed into a stone slate by Makai Priests using nine other Horrors as foundation stones. In the present day, the slate was uncovered and while being exposed at a museum, it is unsealed by a mysterious figure, and one of the Horrors possesses the body of the security guard Sekiya who has been watching over the museum that night. Meanwhile, an unknown woman wakes up from a grave at an unknown location. At the Saejima estate, Raiga Saejima is informed about Eyrith's advent and that a magic tool is being sent from the Senate to assist him. Raiga then starts his investigation with Zaruba when the mysterious woman meets Sekiya and starts trailing him. When night falls, Sekiya confronts the woman and just as he is about to attack her, Raiga appears to confront him, revealing himself as the current Garo. Zaruba then identifies Sekiya as the Horror Azdab who attempts to flee, but is slayed by Garo before he can go. Instead of being sealed into the Garouken, Azdab is transformed into a small stone and the woman introduces herself as Mayuri, the person mentioned in the letter from the Senate. When Raiga asks her about the magic tool he was entrusted to, Mayuri seals the stone into her own body, revealing that the magic tool in question is actually herself.
2	"Pests"; Transliteration: "Gaichū" (Japanese: 害虫)	Keita Amemiya; Hisako Fujihira	April 11, 2014
An old homeless woman is possessed by a Horror, while the Makai Knight Crow investigates the destroyed slate and finds evidence that a Makai Priest was responsible for it. Back at the Saejima estate, Mayuri is introduced to Gonza and explains to Raiga that one among the nine Horrors that were sealed in the slate carry the seed of Eyrith. Once it sprouts, it will allow Messiah to appear in the human world once more. She also claims that Eyrith's seed should sprout in around 100 days and it must be sealed before it happens. Once summoned by the new eastern watchdog Jiiru, Raiga is informed that the Horror Exta has appeared and she orders him to bring it down. Once Raiga and Mayuri finally reach the Horror, Mayuri reveals that Exta does not contain Eyrith's seed, when Crow appears to confront it as well. Impolite with Raiga at first, Crow adopts a more humble attitude once realizing that he is the current Garo and reveals that he is also investigating the incident with the slate, as it occurred within his jurisdiction. Once tracking Exta thanks to a special shuriken Crow threw at her, the three confront the Horror when Crow is knocked afar, but decides to leave it to Raiga instead of helping him further. The Golden Knight manages to defeat Exta nonetheless, allowing Mayuri to seal its remains.
3	"Greenhouse"; Transliteration: "Onshitsu" (Japanese: 温室)	Hisako Fujihira; Kei Taguchi	April 18, 2014
Erina Tokiwa is a renowned artist who uses flowers in her pieces but kills one of her admirers, believing that it would bring her art to new levels, when a Horror approaches her. Meanwhile at the Saejima estate, Mayuri keeps awake at night and when Gonza suggests her to take a rest, she claims that she has been sleeping for a long time. Now possessed by the Horror Succubus, Erina kills a woman to make another piece of art before she meets Mayuri and becomes interested in her, drawing the girl to her atelier at a greenhouse. The Watchdog realizes this and informs Raiga, urging him to strike the Horror down, but claiming that protecting Mayuri is not a priority. Zaruba guides Raiga to the greenhouse where he confronts Erina who has realized that Mayuri is not human and treats her as an object, much to Raiga's anger. After Raiga cuts Succubus down, Mayuri reveals that the seed of Eyrith was not inside that Horror either, and becomes curious as to why Raiga treats her as a human, despite knowing that she is not.
4	"Movie"; Transliteration: "Eiga" (Japanese: 映画)	Itaru Era; Yūdai Yamaguchi	April 25, 2014
Harima, an old projectionist at the Theater Showa movie theater, is informed by the manager Sasajima that the theater will be closed and is fired after attacking the man furiously. Distraught with his situation of no longer projecting horror movies, Harima is possessed by the Horror Ilgishin and kills his former employer by trapping him inside the zombie film Night of Souls. After attempting to draw Gonza, Raiga learns of Ilgishin's appearance as he confronts the Horror as he was in the middle of claiming a new victim: A horror movie fanatic. After grabbing Mayuri, Raiga is transported into Iigishin's world where he is subjected to scenarios from several horror films including 28 Days Later, Scream and The Silence of the Lambs before Ilgishin assumes his true form and battles Raiga as he equips the Garo armor. During the fight, Raiga learns that the Horror's weakness is fire and uses it to destroy the Horror and his film. Seeing the horror movie fanatic running off, Mayuri and Zaruba make light of Raiga being in the movie.
5	"Star Chart"; Transliteration: "Seizu" (Japanese: 星図)	Norio Kida	May 2, 2014
An English-speaking foreigner named Luke is a serial killer who murders his victims to make them his "stars". After approaching and murdering his latest victim, Luke finds himself attacked by the Horror Stellas, becoming its host while continuing his murder spree by literally turning his victims into stardust that he inhales. As Mayuri wonders what to wish for after learning of shooting stars, Raiga learns of the recent Horror attacks and that Crow will be joining his mission to stop Eyrith's bloom. Later that night, with the conditions right for their quarry, Crow manages to locate Stellas and engages the Horror before Raiga arrives. With Mayuri revealing him to be one of the slate Horrors yet not possessing Eyrith's seed, Crow fights Stellas in his true form before donning his armor. Though Stellas takes flight to unleash a meteor shower on the city, Crow sprouts wings to pursue the Horror and weakens him for Raiga to deal the deathblow. As Mayuri seals the Horror's remains into her body, Raiga expresses an interest in Crow's ability yet warns him not to be reckless. Later, Raiga and Mayuri look at the shooting stars as the former tells his companion that there are also stars on the ground as well.
6	"Wind Chimes"; Transliteration: "Fūrin" (Japanese: 風鈴)	Sumiko Umeda	May 9, 2014
While seeing Gonza cleaning up the estate, Raiga discovers a wind chime that he made in his youth around the time he met a wind chime maker named Shimada and his son Tetsuya. Visited by the masked child with a letter detailing his next mission, Raiga learns his that quarry is Shimada who became the host of a Horror after Tetsuya died a few years ago. Eventually finding Shimada and confirming that has become a Horror, Raiga sees no choice but to put the old man out of his misery. When Shimada assumes his true Horror form, Egosiren, he battles Raiga after he equips the Garo armor. The fight ends with Shimada impaled and regaining some of his humanity before shattering into glass, Raiga assuring Mayuri that slaying Horrors if his mission. Later, as Raiga introduces Crow to Gonza, Mayuri tries on the yukata of Raiga's mother and wanders around the town.
7	"Myth"; Transliteration: "Shinwa" (Japanese: 神話)	Keita Amemiya; Itaru Era	May 16, 2014
While training underground with the pendulum created from the fang of the Grou Dragon, Raiga is surprised when the fang reacts to him with Crow saving him. Learning that the evil qi accumulated from his ninety-nine battles is beginning to manifest within him, Raiga departs with Mayuri to the Tower of Heroic Spirits. On the way, revealing his parents mysteriously disappeared, Raiga tells Mayuri how he gained the title at the tower and along with hope when learning his father still lives. After purifying his body and retrieving a new fang, Raiga returns with Mayuri when they are attacked a Horror that knocks the fang into a nearby sculpture. Once the Horror is defeated, unaware that fang disturbed something within, Raiga returns to the mansion to reinstall the fang. But Raiga learns that time has stopped around him as he confronted by Demon Beast Zaji before he splits into three. Killing one of Zaji's clones to restore time, Raiga reaches Gonza before time is frozen again. Taking their fight to an alternate dimension, Raiga manages to take out the other Zaji clone before being overpowered by the real one as he transforms into a more demonic-form. Before Zaji can kill him, Raiga receives a vision of a previous Garo that he has gained Gōten with his fight with Zaji counting as his trial of darkness. Raiga uses Goten to fatally wound Zaji, his opponent's death allowing him to returns to his reality. Assuring Gonza he is alright, Raiga promises to become stronger for the sake of those who fought as Garo in the past, and those who will do so in the future.
8	"Family"; Transliteration: "Kazoku" (Japanese: 家族)	Hisako Fujihira	May 23, 2014
In a forest, a salaryman is about to hang himself when he hears the sound of laughter and sees a light. Following the light and laughter, the man comes across an old inconspicuous house where a large family that asks him to come in. Though welcomed at first, thinking they have given him a new lease on life, the man finds himself dumped into the family's pot. Soon after, the house disappears and appears the next day at another location where the family get another victim. At that time, Raiga is alerted to the presence of the Horror Delitus as he heads out with Mayuri, who watches another family fall apart on the way. Saving a young woman from their communal pot, Raiga exposes the family's scheme while having Mayuri take their guest to safety. Though the family patriarch Ichiro defends their reasoning of making humans happy, Raiga finds their ideals appalling as the fight commences. After Raiga defeats them, the family assumes their true form as the core of Delitus, which is the house itself. Though outmatched by the large Horror after donning the Garo armor, Raiga summons Gōten to destroy Delitus. Soon after, watching the human family from before back together, Mayuri learns from Raiga that is the true warmth of a family.
9	"Raising"; Transliteration: "Shiiku" (Japanese: 飼育)	Sumiko Umeda; Keita Amemiya	May 30, 2014
After finding a pale naked woman lying on the side of the road, an aloof university student named Mikimoto takes her to a room at the Natural Science Club. Though the girl is unresponsive, Mikimoto finds her eating animals stored in the club as her skin starts becoming less pale. Though still unable to reach through to her, Mikimoto keeps feeding the girl more live animals before she molts out of her old skin. As these events unfold, Gonza finds a stag beetle and begins raising it with Mayuri's help while Raiga and Crow learn of the Horror Lizary which has yet to fully manifest after taking a host body. As Raiga arrives with Crow and Mayuri at the site where Lizary emerged into their world, the same place Mikimoto found the strange girl, Mikimoto is visited by his friend who expresses worry for his odd behavior before realizing he has a girl in the club room. After seeing his friend opening the closet, Mikimoto watches the man get killed by the girl before witnessing her enter a pupal state. By the time the Makai Knights and Mayuri arrive at the club room, Mikimoto and the cocoon are gone. Raiga investigates the closet and is horrified by what he sees. The Makai Knights eventually find Mikimoto as he caresses the woman once she emerges from his cocoon, asking her to eat him alive, before it is revealed that he is the host of Lizary. Mayuri uses her powers to awaken Mikimoto's suppressed memories of having raped and killed the girl whose corpse became the Inga Gate that Lizary emerged from. From there, killing more girls for nourishment and then his friend when he found his victims' corpses in the closet, Mikimoto became unaware of his true actions due to the Horror altering his host's perception. Now fully awoken, Lizary offends Raiga with his ideals of human life before assuming his true form. Raiga and Crow don their Makai Armor and soon dispatch Lizary together. Soon after, Gonza discovers that the stag beetle has died, and becomes somewhat distraught. Mayuri takes the insect's lifeless body in her hands while pondering on what becomes of a soul after death.
10	"Dinner Table"; Transliteration: "Shokutaku" (Japanese: 食卓)	Kei Taguchi	June 6, 2014
Raiga is informed of the advent of the Horror Granda, but despite knowing the location, it is uncertain when it will appear, and thus Raiga and Mayuri leave to stand guard for its arrival. Before leaving, Raiga suggests to Gonza that he take the day off, but the butler offers some sandwiches for them to eat, and Mayuri claims that she cannot tell him how good it is because as a magic tool, she has no sense of taste. Gonza then spends his break with his old friend Anna. While out with her, Gonza expresses to Anna his attachment to Mayuri and his will to make her smile. Anna then suggests that he make Mayuri the special soup of the Saejima family. Elsewhere, Granda finally manifests itself and Mayuri recognizes it as one of the Horrors from the slate, but it still does not carry Eyrith's seed. As the Horror is defeated by Raiga and sealed by Mayuri, Gonza finishes cooking the soup, but feels it is not enough to please Mayuri until he has a plan. After Mayuri and Raiga return home, Gonza serves them the soup, and remembering how Mayuri smiled for a while, while looking at a Makai painting, he asks Anna, who made the painting, to make a magic drawing on the plate, and she smiles just as Gonza expected. Gonza mentions that the soup is a special recipe exclusive to the members of the Saejima family, implying that he recognizes her as a part of it.
11	"Manga"; Transliteration: "Manga" (Japanese: 漫画)	Yūsuke Kawanami; Kei Taguchi	June 13, 2014
A manga artist named Seiji Kawabata has just finished the latest installment of his Dragon Lawyer series, but he learns that his oldest assistant Tanaka is leaving him because he feels Kawabata's talent is dwindling. This causes Kawabata's darkness to manifest just as a Horror possesses him, allowing him to kill Tanaka and take the man's talent as his own. He then creates a new manga Makai King which becomes a smash hit, while he secretly kills and takes out other comic book artists to regain his former glory. Later, Raiga comes a newsstand holding Makai King with Mayuri and Zaruba confirming that some of the words in the book are of the Horror tongue. They decide to approach Kawabata, Raiga pretending to be interested in pitching a new story to him, as they catch him as he was about to eat his newest aide Suzuki. With Mayuri revealing that the Horror possessing him is not one of the ones from the slab, Raiga battles Kawabata before taking their fight to the rooftops. There, while fighting his way through manga images and sound effects, Raiga dons his armor to face Kawabata in his true form: Caricatuan. Though Caricatuan has the advantage as he has already written how the fight will end with him killing the Makai Knight, Raiga uses the ink to take out the last panel so he can land the death blow instead. With the Horror dead, Kawabata lasts long enough to see Mayuri enjoying his first manga, Ninja Rin. After reading Ninja Rin himself, Raiga is reminded of his mother's words on how the most important part of art is that people feel something after experiencing it.
12	"Word Spirit"; Transliteration: "Kotodama" (Japanese: 言霊)	Keita Amemiya	June 20, 2014
Karina, a translator living out in the countryside, finds a ball of fuzz near a tree and places it in a jar in her home. That night, Karina dreams of meeting her grandfather Shuji, and when they see a blur in her dream, he refers to it as a Tsukitonbo. When she wakes up, she finds that the ball of fuzz has doubled in size and has broken free from the jar, moving about her room on its own. In the following days, Karina keeps the creature until one night when her house is suddenly haunted, which prompts Raiga and Crow to arrive to dispel the illusion. Raiga tells Karina that she has found the lost offspring of a Spirit Beast and he is to return it to its parent. Karina asks to go with Raiga, and he agrees on the condition that she has her memories of the event erased afterwards. Entrusting Crow and Mayuri to look after things in his stead, Raiga gives Karina an elixir to see the world that normal humans are unable to see. On the way to the meeting point, Karina speaks of Shuji and the Tsukitonbo statue that he had made for her after they saw the spirit in the past. Eventually, Raiga and Karina arrive at a dam where the parent Spirit Beast, a Tsukitonbo, appears to pick its child up. As the reunion of parent and child causes Raiga to remember his own mother, he gives Karina closure that Shuji loved her very much to give her something created in a Spirit Beast's image. Sometime later, Karina wakes up at home with no memory of what has happened, but feels good about something she cannot quite remember. Raiga watches from afar, and heads home, only to find Mayuri waiting for him so they can return together.
13	"Ferocious Beast"; Transliteration: "Kyōjū" (Japanese: 凶獣)	Kei Taguchi	June 27, 2014
Having just slain a horror, Raiga and Mayuri happen upon Crow who reveals that he is heading to the mountains to purify his blade in the Moonlight Ritual. He asks Raiga and Mayuri to follow him, telling them of his mentor on the way. But once at the mountain where the ritual takes place, the Makai Knights and Mayuri hear yelling and run to find Crow's fellow Makai Knights after they have been brutally attacked. One of the surviving Makai Knights, Gento, reveals that they were waiting for Crow when, by accident, Barg awakened and has run off. After Crow and Zaruba explain that Barg is a Horror-eating beast used in the Moonlight Ritual, Raiga aids Crow and Gento to find Barg before it dies and the Horrors in its stomach escape. However, as it eludes its pursuers, Barg kills the other Makai Knight Shizuru while spiriting Mayuri off. When she awakes just before nightfall, Mayuri finds Barg beginning to die from exposure to the human world and she sympathizes with the monster. By then, Raiga and the other Makai Knights arrive with a revenge-driven Gento willing to destroy Mayuri to kill Barg. This prompts Raiga to fight Gento as Barg sprouts wings to fly off with Mayuri. Crow equips his armor to pursue, engaging Barg in an aerial dog fight while saving Mayuri. Seeing the dying Barg still intent to fight, Mayuri decides to consciously activate her power to absorb Barg at the cost of her own life. Luckily, Raiga arrives in time to stop Mayuri as he engages Barg with Crow and Gento creating a barrier to hold the monster so Raiga can kill it. By sunrise, Mayuri has built a grave for Barg as Gento pays respects to his fallen comrades before making his apologies to Raiga. When Raiga turns his attention to Mayuri, she explains that she is no different from Barg while Crow tells her that she is more human than she thinks because of her compassion. The Makai Knight explains to her that he only killed Barg because it was at the point of no return. Later, Mayuri asks Raiga that if she ends up in a similar situation to Barg, she wants him to destroy her before she can be a danger to others, but Raiga promises to protect her so they never have to make that decision.
14	"Transformation"; Transliteration: "Henshin" (Japanese: 変身)	Sumiko Umeda	July 11, 2014
Raiga and Crow encounter the Horror Idora, whom Mayuri reveals to possess Eyrith's seed. But after Garo slays Idora, the sprout that is Eyrith vanishes and Mayuri suddenly falls ill after absorbing Idora's essence. Raiga and Crow later learn that Eyrith transferred herself into another of the slab Horrors and that they must find the remaining four, and learn that the Makai Priest Shidou will be visiting them to check on Mayuri's condition. When they return to the mansion, they find Gonza drunk, until they are formally introduced to Shidou. Shidou, upon examination of Mayuri, discovers that she has consciously activated her inherent powers. After she is sent to bed, Shidou tells Raiga and Crow that Mayuri is actually a human, rather than simply a tool, who possesses the powers she does now because her mother was possessed by a Horror when pregnant with her. However, as her ability to seal Horrors made her useful, Shidou explains that he treated her like an object to keep her from falling victim to human emotions. Zaruba and Orva reveal that they sense the faint presence of a Horror, and Shidou explains that the Horror essence within Mayuri is slowly consuming her, as she wanders around town on her own. Raiga and Crow find her, having been manipulated by Idora to fall into temptation, and she has fallen into an even deeper sleep. Shidou believes that they are too late to save her, but Raiga decides to enter her subconscious to destroy Idora's presence within her mind, freeing Mayuri from the mental cage at the cost of his own lifespan. The next day, Shidou deems that Mayuri's condition has stabilized and suggests that Raiga get some rest. He realizes he was wrong in treating Mayuri as an object, and admits how proud he is of the strong woman she has become.
15	"Tea"; Transliteration: "Kōcha" (Japanese: 紅茶)	Kei Taguchi	July 18, 2014
Gonza welcomes a cameraman who claims to be from the Makai news organization and wants to interview him. After giving the cameraman tea, Gonza proceeds to speak highly of Raiga and what kind of man he is compared to his previous employers. Gonza then explains Raiga's mission to find Eyrith and the Horrors of the Ady Slate. After the interviewer asks about Raiga's weakness, Gonza reveals that he has a thing for symmetry before he proceeds to talk about Mayuri and her role in Raiga's hunt for the Ady Slate Horrors along with her gradual changes. When the topic of Crow is brought up, Gonza admits that he only knows him from Raiga's perspective, but he says he Crow had some profound melancholy while once seeing him brood over his bangs. As the sun sets, the topic of Kouga's disappearance is brought up. Gonza is reluctant to speak about it, but eventually reveals how Kaoru was sucked into a vortex when Raiga was only six years old, and Kouga followed her in to save her. Gonza asks the interviewer to edit it out that revelation, while stating his hopes that his former master and mistress are still alive. Suddenly, Gonza hears Raiga returning and leaves to greet him. The interviewer attempts to leave before being seen by Raiga, but he is soon revealed to be a Horror, and is slain by Raiga and Crow after cornering it. Raiga watches the recording, and teases Gonza about what he said about them to the interviewer as he serves them all tea. Raiga then finishes the interview, praising Gonza for all he has done for the household. Gonza is moved to tears, just as the camera is accidentally knocked to the floor.
16	"Scream"; Transliteration: "Zekkyō" (Japanese: 絶叫)	Hisako Fujihira; Keita Amemiya	July 25, 2014
Iida and two other representatives of the Okura leisure company meet with a ride developer Kiera who has come up with a new thrill ride. Upon entering a large box that Kiera calls the greatest motion simulator ever made, Iida and the others are terrified upon finishing the ride and agree to pay her for the device. Kiera agrees to let them use her creation on the condition that she hosts a nighttime event for it within a week's time. The following night, confused as to how the box works, Iida returns to the development lab to find out Kiera's secret, but she spots him. She decides to subject him to the box's true abilities, scaring him to death by sending him into the Demon World and then transforming him into a sphere that she eats. The next day, Raiga has just explained to Mayuri the difference between fear and terror, when he and Crow are alerted to the presence of the Horror Profundes. The two Makai Knights are told that they must stop her from feeding, because she sends several humans to the Demon World in order to do so. They track Profundes down to Kiera's ride, with Kiera revealed to be the Horror's host. Crow drives away the crowd of onlookers so they are not sacrificed as Raiga battles Profundes's true form within the alternate dimension on the "thrill ride". Raiga as Garo manages to slay Profundes in her true form, but he soon finds himself dragged down into the Demon World, with hundreds of Horrors swarming around him and dragging him in. Crow arrives in the knick of time to save Raiga from being overwhelmed, and they return to the human world safely. The next day, Mayuri decides to try out one of the real thrill rides at the amusement park, and Raiga confides in Crow that he never before experienced true terror like that.
17	"The Boy"; Transliteration: "Shōnen" (Japanese: 少年)	Keita Amemiya; Itaru Era	August 1, 2014
It is Raiga's birthday and as Gonza explains to Mayuri and Crow that making the cake is one of the duties Kaoru left to him, Raiga dreams about of the events that took place four years after his parents' disappearance. Injuring himself while training, Raiga met a Makai Priestess who heals while warning him of weak Makai Knights getting killed. Back at home, Gonza asks Raiga which cake he wants for his birthday party, but he refuses to celebrate it. Later at night, Raiga is visited by Rei Suzumura, who tests his strength before taking him on a Horror hunt. After Raiga correctly deduces that a woman sitting in the park is a Horror's vessel, on the grounds that she was reading in the dark, Rei lends the boy a Madō Lighter to have him handle her. Once he exposes the Horror, with Rei watching from afar, Raiga emulates Rei's fighting style against the Horror before she overpowers him. Luckily, Rei intervenes and forces the Horror into her true form before slaying the monster in front of Raiga. Soon after, Rei presents Raiga the choice to live a normal life or take the dangerous path of a Makai Knight as his apprentice. Raiga accepts and the two resume the Horror hunt. The next day, Raiga meets the Makai Priestess on the way home, thanking her for her help before giving her a present while learning someone dear to her has embarked on a dangerous journey. Upon returning home, Rei explains to a worried Gonza that he promised Kouga to train Raiga once he turned 10 and, as Raiga sleeps while they finished the preparations for the boy's birthday, Rei informs the butler that he will search for Kouga and Kaoru once their son's training is complete. Raiga then reminisces celebrating his birthday with Gonza and Rei and upon awakening at the present time, he does so with Gonza, Mayuri, and Crow as well.
18	"Crimson Lotus"; Transliteration: "Guren" (Japanese: 紅蓮)	Itaru Era	August 8, 2014
On a moonlit night, a Makai Priestess confronts a man she recognizes as the Makai Knight Izumo who has become the host of a Horror. The priestess battles the fallen Makai Knight before he eludes her to find an ideal opponent to devour. Later, Raiga is told of the fallen Makai Knight and that he is assigned aid the Makai Priestess, the Darkness Hunter Bikuu, in slaying the Horror possessing him. After learning more of Bikuu, Raiga meets the Darkness Hunter who refuses their help unless they have the strength to face the fallen Makai Knight. Raiga accepts her challenge, defeating Bikuu through the intensity of their stand off. After telling Raiga of the name of the fallen Makai Knight and the Horror possessing him, Latel, Bikuu uses the charm she planted on Izumo to lead the group to him. After sunset, the group finds Latel with Mayuri confirming him as a slab Horror, but without Eyrith's seed. Upon recognizing Raiga as Garo, Latel engages him in a battle before separating him from the others to finish him off. Luckily for Raiga, Bikuu comes to his aid as he dons the Garo armor to battle Latel, leaving the Horror open to an attack by Bikuu on his shoulder. This allows the Makai Knight to land the death blow, with Bikuu proceeding to purify Izumo's remains while Mayuri absorbs Latel's stone. Before taking her leave, while revealing that Izumo was her younger brother, Bikuu explains her next mission is to find the robed figure responsible for freeing the slab Horrors while revealing a legend that details Eyrith's bloomed flower being able to revive the dead.
19	"Suite"; Transliteration: "Kumikyoku" (Japanese: 組曲)	Sumiko Umeda	August 15, 2014
Across the city, people are being victimized by the feeding frenzy of a Horror that entered the body of orchestra conductor Johann before the creature becomes bored with his prey. At Saejima Manor, Mayuri intently listens to a record player playing Clair de Lune with Gonza and Raiga wondering what feelings it stirs in the young woman. Soon after, Raiga is alerted to the presence of a Horror with Zaruba confirming their quarry to be a musical Horror named Abysscore as Raiga finds a personal invitation from Johann. After Mayuri confirms that Abysscore is a Ady Slate Horror, she finds herself kidnapped by Johan as he wants to taste the Life Score of a non-normal human. Luckily, Raiga saves Mayuri as he fights Johann before the Horror assumes his true form. Equipping the Garo armor, Raiga turns Abysscore's Makai March band against him before slaying the Horror as Johann dies applauding the Makai Knight's song. Sometime later, Raiga sees Mayuri listening to Clair de Lune before she tells him that Eyrith will awaken soon.
20	"Tetsujin"; Transliteration: "Tetsujin" (Japanese: 鉄人)	Norio Kida; Keita Amemiya	August 22, 2014
After having extinguished some Yin Gates, Crow reminds Orva of his duties as the Phantom Knight to act from the shadows. He soon receives a letter from Meme with orders to defeat a large Horror named Duoct. After sunset, Crow encounters a schoolgirl he believes to be Duoct before she summons the actual Horror to her aid. Raiga soon joins him, but the two find themselves powerless against Duoct. Just before dawn, they hear a voice from within Duoct as the Horror and the school girl leave. Crow recognizes that her school uniform is the same as a school he had passed the previous day, and after arriving he discovers a man attempting to find his missing daughter Saki Mizuno. He tells Crow that she mysteriously disappeared three nights ago when she and her friends were having a courage test in the forest. However, Crow wonders how she could possibly be the Horror's host without having an inner darkness. Later, Duoct attacks Mayuri, and during the fight it is revealed that the Saki who is ordering Duoct around is a Horror posing as her while the real Saki is inside Duoct's body. Crow quickly kills the impostor and Duoct escapes Crow believes that Saki is beyond salvation, but Raiga tells him that he has a plan and wants him on stand-by. Having remembered how his father saved his mother in the past, Raiga meets Duoct and allows the Horror to consume him so he can destroy it from the inside while having the Garo armor form around himself and Saki. After explaining that Saki will awaken with no memory of her ordeal, Raiga tells Crow that he deserves thanks for his role in saving Saki. The next day, Crow watches Saki resume her normal life before assuming his duties as the Phantom Knight.
21	"Afterimage"; Transliteration: "Zanzō" (Japanese: 残像)	Sumiko Umeda	August 29, 2014
While fighting a Horror, Raiga encounters a mysterious man named Matō who devours the creature while revealing himself as a Makai Knight-like Horror named Gogeet. Gogeet then proceeds to fight Raiga while offering an alliance to the Makai Knight. Though Raiga refuses the offer, he is unable to land the deathblow when a little girl named appears at Gogeet's side, the Horror introducing her as his daughter Ai before taking his leave. After a night of searching, Raiga reports Gogeet to Jiiru as she tells him to confirm if he is one of two remaining Ady Slate Horrors. Jiiru also reminds Raiga that Eyrith's sealing is more important when the question of Mayuri's fate after their mission has ended is brought up. Mayuri and Raiga split up to search for Matō, with the former finding him and confirming to possess Eyrith's seed. Having suspected Eyrith's presence, Gogeet explains that Ai is only an illusion of a deceased girl that he is recently able to conjure. Mayuri regroups with Raiga and Crow, revealing what she has learned, and they hunt down Gogeet and the Makai Knight fight him for several hours past nightfall. Raiga eventually musters the nerve to strike down Ai and gravely wounds Gogeet's arm as the Horror was about to kill Mayuri. Gogeet then assumes his true form, unconcerned with losing his illusion as he reveals that Ai was actually his first victim. This revelation enrages Raiga as he equips the Garo armor to attack Gogeet without mercy before killing the Horror. Just as Mayuri is about to seal Eyrith's seed, she is stopped by the figure responsible for unleashing the Horrors of the Ady Slate in the first place. As the figure explains his reasons are tied to the Makai Flower, he is revealed to be someone who Crow recognizes.
22	"Guard Dog"; Transliteration: "Banken" (Japanese: 番犬)	Itaru Era; Keita Amemiya	September 5, 2014
Recognizing the figure, Crow gives chase after the figure left while leaving a foreboding message that everything will begin soon. Raiga, after sending Mayuri home, approaches Jiiru and learns the mysterious man to be a Makai Knight of the Senate named Eiji Busujima. Raiga also learns that Busujima is the holder of the title Giru the Heretic Bone Knight and is Crow's mentor. Though he refuses to accept Crow may have spied for Busujima, Raiga agrees that finding Busujima and sealing Eyrith is essential while asking for Mayuri's freedom once it is over. At the same, sensing Eyrith entering its final Horror host, Mayuri leaves Saejima Manor to find it. Eventually, after a confrontation with his mentor, Crow finds Raiga and tells him that Busujima needs Eyrith to bring back someone from the dead. While it would be impossible, Crow remembered the first time he met Mayuri while under Busujima and that his mentor mentioned it is possible she can also seal human souls. The two Makai Knights realize Mayuri is targeted by Busujima and attempt to find her. However, after knocking out the Ady Slate Horror Jienda, Busujima captures Mayuri and proceeds to extract Eyrith's seed from Jienda. Awakened as a result, the Makai Knight promising to allow the Horror to bloom, Eyrith agrees to grant Busujima's wish to bring back his lover as she uses a strain of the woman's hair to produce her body in her root. But Mayuri consciously opens her gate to enable Raiga and Crow to pinpoint her location with the contained Horror essence. However, leaving Mayuri with Eyrith, Busujima confronts Raiga and Crow to keep them from preventing the revival of his beloved Akari: The Makai Priestess that Raiga met as a child.
23	"Reminiscence"; Transliteration: "Tsuisō" (Japanese: 追想)	Itaru Era; Keita Amemiya	September 12, 2014
Busujima reveals that his lover Akari's spirit is within Mayuri. Crow is willing to fight him, but Raiga tells him to find Mayuri instead as he and Busujima equip their respective Makai Knight armors to finish the fight. As Raiga asks Busujima if this is what Akari wants, he manages to defeat Giru as he reveals that he knew Akari and gave her the bell that Busujima now possesses. Though Raiga states his intent to spare him for Akari's sake, Busujima refuses to surrender. But before the fight resumes, Mayuri runs in and reveals that Crow has sacrificed himself to save her from being possessed by Eyrith. After explaining that Eyrith needs a host to take her to where she must bloom, Busujima attempts to have the Horror relinquish her host for him. But Eyrith uses Crow's body to destroy the Akari clone and then mortally wounds Busujima before taking to the air. As Raiga pursues Crow on Gōten, Mayuri reveals to Busujima that she never had Akari's soul and only responded to his feelings of loss. This makes Busujima feel everything he did was for nothing as Mayuri tells him that Akari lives on through him. Bikuu arrives and deems Busujima no longer her quarry as she decides to treat his wounds while Mayuri finds Raiga.
24	"Marebito"; Transliteration: "Marebito" (Japanese: 稀人)	Keita Amemiya	September 19, 2014
Once Crow reaches the location where Eyrith is to bloom, Raiga attempts to force the Horror out of the Makai Knight, but Eyrith forces Crow to express the resentment he bears towards Raiga for his kindness towards Mayuri. Raiga disarms Crow so they can settle things with their fists, refusing to give up on his friend, which forces Eyrith to leave Crow's body and manifest a human-like body for herself. She proceeds to the middle of the lake where she grows into a giant tree, and from there she creates portals to absorb multiple Horrors from across time and space across the world. With Mayuri unable to absorb Eyrith until the bulb is destroyed, Raiga is forced to climb to the top of the tree on foot and confronts Eyrith upon reaching the top. Though she attempts to tempt Raiga into allowing her to bloom, she ends up restraining him after playing with him and is revealed to be the cause of his parents' disappearance. She offers to return them safely if Raiga allows her to bloom, but he angrily refuses and proceeds to fight Eyrith before she once more restrains him and drains the remaining seconds of the time limit from his armor. As Eyrith begins to bloom, which is sensed by Shidou as he just arrived in town, Mayuri and Crow find themselves facing the Horror's new line of defense: Raiga as the feral Lost Soul Beast Garo.
25	"Destiny"; Transliteration: "Tenmei" (Japanese: 天命)	Keita Amemiya	September 26, 2014
With Raiga attempting to fight the inner darkness as Crow and Busujima hold him at bay, Mayuri decides to seal the blooming Eyrith with Bikuu covering her before being captured. Things seem hopeless as Eyrith begins to summon Horrors from across all time until Raiga's light is rekindled by Akari's charm. He uses his Lost Soul Beast Garo form to reach Eyrith before his armor assumes Light Awakening Beast Garo form to fatally wound the Horror. He explains to Eyrith that her plan is flawed because the Horrors she have summoned have already been killed by his predecessors and other Makai Knights across time. Eyrith's body is destroyed with Mayuri reforms the Ady Slate around the Horror's surviving core. Though Zaruba mentions Eyrith may have reunited him with his parents, Raiga believes that he will find them on his own someday. A new problem soon raises from Mayuri not entering her deep sleep as Shidou reveals that she will die from lingering Horror thoughts still within her mind. Though the only way to save her is to enter her mind and purge the Horror thoughts, it would only ensure that Mayuri will forget everything as she enters her rest. Raiga assures a fearful Mayuri that they will just begin again with everyone else's support before he enters her mind and purifies the Horror cage. Days later, with Mayuri still sleeping, Raiga and everyone else resume their usual Makai Knight activities as Busujima makes a grave for Akari. But one day, Raiga visits Mayuri's room after his rounds and finds her awake with her memories apparently intact.
