= Yasukaze Motomiya =

Japanese actor (born 1972)

- 本宮 泰風
- Born: Yasuyuki Hirai; 7 February 1972 (age 54); Adachi, Tokyo, Japan
- Occupation: Actor
- Years active: 1994–present
- Agent: Triple A
- Notable work: Nihon Tōitsu series
- Television: Kamen Rider Blade
- Spouse: Akiko Matsumoto
- Relatives: Ryuji Harada (brother)

Yasukaze Motomiya (本宮 泰風, Motomiya Yasukaze; born February 7, 1972, in Adachi, Tokyo) is a Japanese actor. His real name is Yasuyuki Hirai (平井 康之, Hirai Yasu'yuki). He is represented by Triple A.

== Biography ==
Motomiya's elder brother is Ryuji Harada, which is also an actor as well as a youtuber. His sister-in-law is Ai Harada, which is a TV personality and blogger. His nephew is the youtuber Kazuto Hirai. His wife is tarento Akiko Matsumoto..

Motomiya was scouted after his older brother entered the entertainment industry and debuted in 1994 Spur wa Yukue Fumei (Nippon TV). Contrary to Harada's brother who often plays "good" characters, he often plays villain, suspicious, or to-be-killed characters.

Motomiya's son is a big fan of the Heisei Kamen Rider series. He appeared in Kamen Rider Blade as an Isaka/Peacock Undead (name given to the monsters of the show) so that "my [his] son will be delighted". When Motomiya appeared on the programme, he declared that he harassed the cast, through actions such as hiding the shoes of the persons cast to be the Rider, and doing "hatred efforts".

Alongside his acting career, he's also the president of the mixed martial arts team Motomiya Juku. He's also a close friend of Hitoshi Ozawa, and acts as a member and captain of Ozawa's baseball team.

Motomiya's special skills are kendo, MMA fighting, boxing, and baseball.

== Filmography ==
=== TV dramas ===
| Run | Title | Role | Notes | Ref. |
|---|---|---|---|---|
| 2014 | S: The Last Policeman | Ichiro Yamanaka | | |
| 2017 | The Supporting Actors | Himself | Episode 7 | |
| 2020 | Awaiting Kirin | Bandit leader | Taiga drama | |
| 2025 | Unbound | Wakagiya Yohachi | Taiga drama | |

=== Films ===
| Year | Title | Role | Notes | Ref. |
|---|---|---|---|---|
| 1999 | Jubaku: Spellbound | | | |
| 2006 | Sun Scarred | Makoto Nitta | | |
| 2021 | The Supporting Actors: The Movie | Himself | | |
| 2021 | Baby Assassins | Ippei Hamaoka | | |
| 2022 | Kyoto Camaro Detective | | | |
| 2022 | The Y-Team | Renji Himuro | also producer | |
| 2022 | The Mukoda Barber Shop | Kazeyasu Miyamoto | | |
| 2022 | Break in the Clouds | | | |
| 2023 | Bad City | Park | | |
| 2023 | Daisuke Jigen | | | |
| 2023 | The Quiet Yakuza Part 1 | Kōshirō Inokubi | | |
| 2023 | The Quiet Yakuza Part 2 | Kōshirō Inokubi | | |
| 2024 | Samurai Detective Onihei: Blood for Blood | Chūsuke | | |
| 2024 | Renji Himuro | Renji Himuro | Lead role | |
| 2024 | The Quiet Yakuza 2: Part 1 | Kōshirō Inokubi | | |
| 2024 | The Quiet Yakuza 2: Part 2 | Kōshirō Inokubi | | |
| 2025 | Ghost Killer | | | |
| 2025 | Isolated | Renji Himuro | | |
| 2026 | The Curse | | Taiwanese-Japanese film | |
| 2026 | The Y-Team 2 | Himuro | | |
| 2026 | Love Me Kill Me | Kajitani | | |

=== Direct-to-video ===
| Year | Title | Role | Notes | Ref. |
|---|---|---|---|---|
| 2013–present | Nihon Tōitsu series | Renji Himuro | Lead role | |

=== Video games ===
| Year | Title | Role | Notes | Ref. |
|---|---|---|---|---|
| 2023 | Like a Dragon Gaiden: The Man Who Erased His Name | Kosei Shishido | | |
| 2027 | Stranger Than Heaven | Tetsuya Hama | | |
