= Asana Mamoru =

Japanese actress and gravure idol (born 1990)

- 護 あさな
- Born: May 4, 1990 (age 36); Tokyo, Japan
- Other name: Mana Kono
- Occupations: Actress, gravure idol
- Years active: 2008–present
- Agent: FMG
- Height: 1.71 m (5 ft 7 in)

Asana Mamoru (護 あさな, Mamoru Asana; born May 4, 1990, in Tokyo, Japan) is a Japanese actress and gravure idol who is represented by the talent agency, FMG. Her old stage name was Mana Kono (河野 麻奈, Kōno Mana).

== Biography ==
Mamoru's hobbies are cooking and listening to music and her skill is ballet. Her father is Cambodian.

Mamoru has a tall slender body type with big breasts. Gekkan Series producer Iwata called them the "Strongest Breasts in Gravure". In October 2009, Gekkan Asana Mamoru is released and she became the first newcomer in the Gekkan series since Haruka Igawa.

In December 2009, Mamoru was awarded the "Miura Award" in the '09 Gravure Tamashi Awards

Her previous agency was LRF, for working for the Gekkan, and her Gekkan blog was closed because of the "circumstances of the management policy". Mamoru later moved to her current agency in December 2009.

== Filmography ==
=== TV series ===
Year	Title	Role	Network	Notes
2008	Music Fighter		NTV	
2008	Music Japan		NHK	
2010	Joyu Ryoku		NTV	
2012	Katsu Shin (Katsura)		WOWOW	Season 2
2014	Aibō		TV Asahi	Season 12, episode 14
2014	Garo: Makai no Hana	Jiiru	TV Tokyo	
2014	Jitsuzai-Sei Million Arthur	Morgause	TVK, CTV, TV Saitama, Sun TV	
2015	Prison School	Meiko Shiraki	MBS, TBS	
2015	AKB Horror Night: Adrenaline's Night	Saeko	TV Asahi	episode 17

=== Films ===
Year	Title	Notes
2012	Zombie Ass	
2012	Tokyo Mujirushi Joshi Monogatari	
2013	Monster	
2013	Jōkyō Monogatari	
2013	Danjo Taisen	Lead role
