= Zombie Ass: Toilet of the Dead =

- Japanese poster
- Directed by: Noboru Iguchi
- Screenplay by: Noboru Iguchi; Ao Murata; Jun Tsugita
- Story by: Tadayoshi Kubo
- Produced by: Yasuhiko Higashi; Ken Ikehara; Masahiro Miyata; Naoya Narita
- Starring: Arisa Nakamura; Asana Mamoru; Mayu Sugano
- Cinematography: Yasutaka Nagano
- Edited by: Takeshi Wada
- Music by: Yasuhiko Fukuda
- Production companies: Arcimboldo Y.K.; Gambit
- Distributed by: Nikkatsu
- Release dates: September 24, 2011 (Fantastic Fest); February 25, 2012 (Japan)
- Running time: 87 minutes
- Country: Japan
- Language: Japanese

Zombie Ass: Toilet of the Dead (Japanese: ゾンビアス, Hepburn: Zonbiasu) is a 2011 Japanese comedy horror film directed by Noboru Iguchi and written by Iguchi, Ao Murata and Jun Tsugita from a story by Tadayoshi Kubo. Starring Arisa Nakamura, Asana Mamoru and Mayu Sugano, the plot follows a pretty young karate student (Nakamura) who, following her younger sister's suicide, goes on a camping trip with friends. Their fun is quickly interrupted by the arrival of feces-covered zombies.

It had its world premiere at Fantastic Fest film festival in Austin, Texas, in September 2011, and was theatrically released in Japan in February 2012.

== Synopsis ==
Wracked with guilt over the suicide of her bullied sister, young karate student Megumi accompanies four older friends on a trip into the woods: smart girl Aya, her druggie boyfriend Také, full-figured model Maki, and nerdy Naoi. Things start to go badly when Maki finds a parasitical worm inside a fish – and eats it down, in the hope that it will keep her skinny. Her stomach later feels horrible and she relieves herself in an outhouse toilet. The parasitic worm she ate had apparently laid eggs in her stomach and came out of her in her diarrhea attack. While Maki was in the toilet, she discovered there was a zombie inside the toilet hole, grabbing her buttocks. However, she decided to fart, which made the zombie cough because her fart was too stinky. She decided to break free from the toilet, and then she let go of another stinky fart before passing out. Soon after, they are attacked by a crowd of feces-covered undead who emerge from the outhouse toilet Maki used.

== Cast ==
- Arisa Nakamura as Megumi
- Asana Mamoru as Maki
- Mayu Sugano as Aya
- Asami as Female Zombie
- Yûki as Ko Tanaka
- Dani as Naoi
- Kentarô Kishi as Tak
- Demo Tanaka as The Shit Zombie
- Sayuri Yajima as Ai
- Kentarô Shimazu as Dr. Tanaka
- Hideki Kurauchi as Hunter
- Takeo Gozu as Hunter
