= Crashout Schoolgirl and Degen Teacher =

Japanese manga series

- First tankōbon volume cover

墜落JKと廃人教師 (Tsuiraku JK to Haijin Kyōshi)
- Genre: Dark comedy; Romantic comedy
- Manga
- Written by: Sora
- Published by: Hakusensha
- English publisher: NA: Comikey
- Imprint: Hana to Yume Comics
- Magazine: Hana to Yume
- Original run: July 20, 2017 – June 5, 2024
- Volumes: 20
- Television drama
- Directed by: Natsuki Takahashi; Sung-ho Moon (S1); Yuka Eda (S2)
- Written by: Ayumi Shimo; Shōta Gajin (S1); Natsuki Takahashi (S2)
- Studio: Humax Cinema (S1); Studio Blue (S2)
- Licensed by: Rakuten Viki
- Original network: MBS TV
- Original run: April 7, 2023 – July 24, 2024
- Episodes: 15

Crashout Schoolgirl and Degen Teacher (墜落JKと廃人教師, Tsuiraku JK to Haijin Kyōshi; lit. "Fallen High School Girl and Disabled Teacher" or "Falling High School Girl and Irresponsible Teacher") is a Japanese manga series written and illustrated by Sora. It was serialized in Hakusensha's Hana to Yume manga magazine from July 2017 to June 2024. It was initially intended to be a short series, but resumed serialization in February 2018. A live-action television drama aired on MBS TV's Drama Tokku programming block from April to June 2023. A second season aired from June to July 2024.

== Synopsis ==
High school student Mikoto Ochiai decides to take her own life after being painfully rejected by her great love. However, at the last minute, her young teacher, Jin Haiba, stops her. To convince her to live, he proposes a relationship, which Ochiai ultimately agrees to, deciding it's worth a try before she dies. Haiba confesses that he fell in love with her because of her kindness. From then on, he appears whenever Ochiai is going through difficult times, trying to comfort her and distract her from negative thoughts. Over time, she truly falls in love with him. However, because Haiba is her teacher, Ochiai refuses to admit it and hides her feelings.

== Characters ==
Mikoto Ochiai (落合扇言, Ochiai Mikoto)
Voiced by: Sora Amamiya (voice drama)
Portrayed by: Akari Takaishi (TV series)
Jin Haiba (灰葉仁, Haiba Jin)
Voiced by: Yuichi Nakamura (voice drama)
Portrayed by: Ryo Hashimoto (TV series)
Kazuma Takamine (高峰一馬, Takamine Kazuma)
Voiced by: Koki Uchiyama (voice drama)
Portrayed by: Kairu Tamura (TV series)
Nazuna Udō (有働なずな, Udō Nazuna)
Voiced by: Akari Kitō (voice drama)
Junto Udō (有働淳人, Udō Junto)
Voiced by: Ryōta Ōsaka (voice drama)

== Media ==
=== Manga ===
Written and illustrated by Sora, Crashout Schoolgirl and Degen Teacher was serialized in Hakusensha's Hana to Yume manga magazine from July 20, 2017, to June 5, 2024. It was initially intended to be a short series, but resumed serialization on February 20, 2018. The series' chapters are published in English by Comikey.

No.	Release date	ISBN
1	February 20, 2018	978-4-59-221652-0
2	July 20, 2018	978-4-59-221653-7
3	December 19, 2018	978-4-59-221654-4
4	April 19, 2019	978-4-59-221655-1
5	July 19, 2019	978-4-59-221656-8; 978-4-59-221790-9 (SE)
6	November 20, 2019	978-4-59-221657-5
7	March 18, 2020	978-4-59-221658-2
8	July 20, 2020	978-4-59-221659-9; 978-4-59-222729-8 (SE)
9	November 20, 2020	978-4-59-221660-5
10	March 19, 2021	978-4-59-222380-1
11	July 20, 2021	978-4-59-222381-8
12	November 19, 2021	978-4-59-222382-5; 978-4-59-222804-2 (SE)
13	April 20, 2022	978-4-59-222383-2
14	August 19, 2022	978-4-59-222384-9
15	December 20, 2022	978-4-59-222385-6
16	April 20, 2023	978-4-59-222386-3; 978-4-59-222886-8 (SE)
17	August 18, 2023	978-4-59-222387-0
18	December 20, 2023	978-4-59-222388-7
19	April 19, 2024	978-4-59-222390-0; 978-4-59-223016-8 (SE)
20	August 20, 2024	978-4-59-222494-5

=== Drama ===
A live-action television drama aired on MBS TV's Drama Tokku programming block from April 7 to June 11, 2023. It featured Ryo Hashimoto as Jin Haiba and Akari Takaishi as Mikoto Ochiai. A second season aired from June 18 to July 24, 2024.

== Reception ==
The series ranked ninth on AnimeJapan's sixth "Most Wanted Anime Adaptation" poll in 2023.

The series had 3 million copies in circulation by March 2023. The series had 4 million copies in circulation by August 2024.
