= Atomu Mizuishi =

Japanese actor (born 1996)

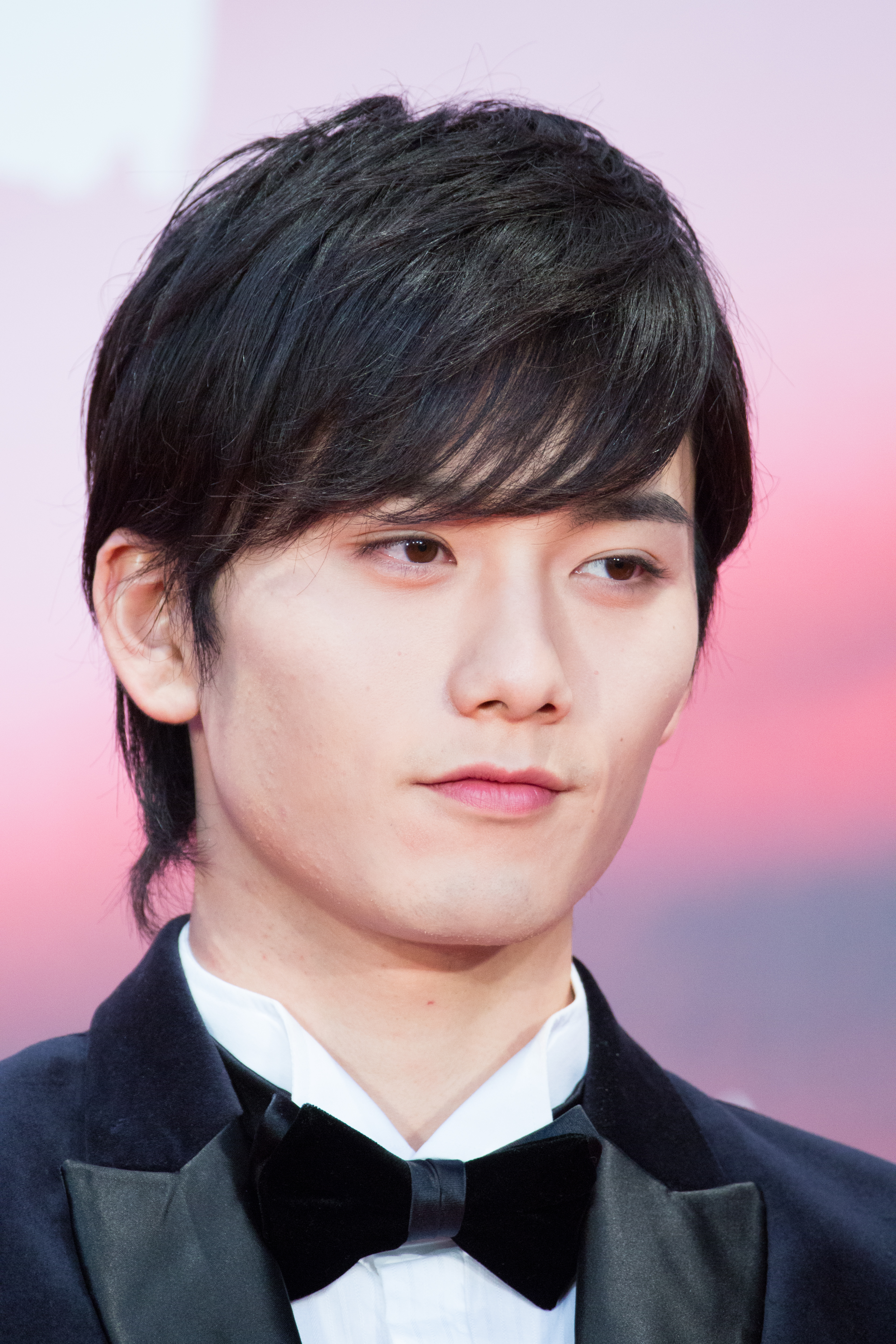
- Mizuishi at the Tokyo International Film Festival in 2017
- Born: January 1, 1996 (age 30); Kanagawa, Japan, Japan
- Occupation: Actor
- Years active: 2012–present
- Agent: Enchante
- Website: Official website

Atomu Mizuishi (水石 亜飛夢, Mizuishi Atomu; born January 1, 1996), is a Japanese actor represented by STRAIGHT entertainment.

== Biography ==
In 2012, he made his debut as an actor portraying Renji Yanagi in Prince of Tennis 2nd season.

In 2014, he portrayed Crow (Makai Knight) in Garo: Makai no Hana.

In 2020, he was cast in Mashin Sentai Kiramager as Shiguru Oshikiri/Kiramai Blue.

== Filmography ==
=== TV dramas ===
Year	Title	Role	Notes	Ref.
2018	Kamen Rider Zi-O	Ryuichi Sakuma/Another Fourze/Another Faiz		
2020	Mashin Sentai Kiramager	Shiguru Oshikiri/Kiramai Blue		
2023	My Personal Weatherman	Atsuya Matsudaira		
2024	Baby Assassins Everyday!	Tasaka		
2025	Masked Ninja Akakage	Fukushima Masanori		

=== Films ===
Year	Title	Role	Notes	Ref.
2017	Fullmetal Alchemist	Alphonse Elric (voice)		
2020	Mashin Sentai Kiramager: Episode ZERO	Shigure Oshikiri/Kirama Blue		
2020	How Neya Ryoka Became a Director	Keita Makabe		
2021	Yellow Dragon's Village		Lead role	
2021	Saber + Zenkaiger: Super Hero Senki	Shiguru Oshikiri/Kiramai Blue		
2021	Kokumin no Sentaku		Lead role	
2021	Baby Assassins	Tasaka		
2021	Mashin Sentai Kiramager vs Ryusoulger	Shiguru Oshikiri/Kiramai Blue		
2022	Fullmetal Alchemist: The Revenge of Scar	Alphonse Elric (voice)		
2022	Kikai Sentai Zenkaiger vs Kiramager vs Senpaiger	Shiguru Oshikiri/Kiramai Blue		
2022	Old School			
2022	Fullmetal Alchemist: The Final Alchemy	Alphonse Elric (voice & actor)		
2022	The Key: Professor's Pleasure	Kimura		
2023	Baby Assassins: 2 Babies	Tasaka		
2023	Old Narcissus			
2023	Immersion	Kitajima		
2023	Wheels and Axle	Seiya		
2024	Documentary of Baby Assassins	Himself	Documentary	
2024	Baby Assassins: Nice Days	Tasaka		
2025	Emergency Interrogation Room: The Final Movie	Hiromichi Morishita (young)		
