= Baby Assassins Everyday! =

2024 Japanese TV series

- ベイビーわるきゅーれ エブリデイ！
- Genre: Action-comedy
- Created by: Yugo Sakamoto
- Based on: Baby Assassins
- Written by: Yugo Sakamoto
- Directed by: Yugo Sakamoto; Kensuke Sonomura (Action); Wataru Hiranami; Wataru Kudo
- Starring: Akari Takaishi as Chisato Sugimoto; Saori Izawa as Mahiro Fukagawa
- Music by: Nobuhiko Morino
- Opening theme: "I kill you" (あいきるゆ ; Ai kiru yu) - Syudou
- Ending theme: "Bandage" (包帯 ; Hotai) - Tele (Kitaro Taniguchi)
- Country of origin: Japan
- Original language: Japanese
- No. of seasons: 1
- No. of episodes: 12

Production
- Producers: Mina Kase (TV Tokyo); Yusuke Suzuki (Rights Cube); Taizo Fukumaki (Solid Feature)
- Running time: 24 minutes
- Production companies: TV Tokyo; Rights Cube; Solid Feature

Original release
- Network: TV Tokyo
- Release: September 4 – November 20, 2024

Baby Assassins Everyday! (Japanese: ベイビーわるきゅーれ エブリデイ！; Hepburn: Beibī Warukyūre Eburidei!) is a Japanese TV drama series. It follows young contract killers Chisato Sugimoto (Akari Takaishi) and Mahiro Fukagawa (Saori Izawa) as they navigate professional challenges and everyday life. It is a sequel to the Baby Assassins film series created by Yugo Sakamoto_{[ja]}. The show premiered on September 4, 2024, on TV Tokyo and aired its twelve episodes weekly on Wednesdays until November 20, 2024.

== Cast ==
- Akari Takaishi as Chisato Sugimoto
- Saori Izawa as Mahiro Fukagawa
- Tsubasa Tobinaga_{[ja]} as Susano
- Atomu Mizuishi as Mamoru Tasaka
- Tomo Nakai_{[ja]} as Mana Miyauchi
- Takuya Kusakawa as Kei Natsume
- Hirotarō Honda as Yukio Miyahara
- Tokio Emoto as Akira Hino

== Music ==
The opening theme is the song "I kill you" (Japanese: あいきるゆ ; Hepburn: Ai kiru yu), written for the drama and performed by Syudou_{[ja]}.

The ending theme is the song "Bandage" (Japanese: 包帯 ; Hepburn: Hotai), performed by Tele (Kitaro Taniguchi)_{[ja]}.

== Release ==
The series premiered ahead of Baby Assassins: Nice days_{[ja]} (the third film in the Baby Assassins film series, which was released on September 27, 2024) even though events take place after those shown in the movie.

== Episodes ==
No.	Title	Original title	Directed by	Written by	Release date	Ref
1	"Freeze bodies together, forever!"	Japanese: 10年後も一緒に死体凍らせよ ; Hepburn: 10-Nen-go mo issho ni shitai kōra seyo	Yugo Sakamoto_{[ja]} / Kensuke Sonomura_{[ja]}(Action)	Yugo Sakamoto_{[ja]}	Sep 4, 2024	
2	"What even is 'Responsibility'?"	Japanese: 社会は責任が伴う場ってなんだよ ; Hepburn: Shakai wa sekinin ga tomonau ba ttena nda yo	Wataru Hiranami_{[ja]}	Yugo Sakamoto_{[ja]}	Sep 11, 2024	
3	"Bringing this one home"	Japanese: この子をお迎えします ; Hepburn: Kono-ko o omukae shimasu	Wataru Kudo / Kensuke Sonomura_{[ja]} (Action)	Yugo Sakamoto_{[ja]}	Sep 18, 2024	
4	"Some things can't fit in 140 characters"	Japanese: 大切な事は140字で伝わらない ; Hepburn: Taisetsuna koto wa 140-ji de tsutawaranai	Yugo Sakamoto _{[ja]}	Yugo Sakamoto_{[ja]}	Sep 25, 2024	
5	"Guidance or harassment?"	Japanese: 指導とハラスメントの境界線は ; Hepburn: Shidō to harasumento no kyōkai-sen wa	Yugo Sakamoto _{[ja]}	Yugo Sakamoto_{[ja]}	Oct 2, 2024	
6	"Money is the only thing you can trust"	Japanese: 信じられるのはお金だけです ; Hepburn: Shinji rareru no wa okane dakedesu	Yugo Sakamoto_{[ja]} / Kensuke Sonomura_{[ja]} (Action)	Yugo Sakamoto_{[ja]}	Oct 9, 2024	
7	"Back home, just like old times"	Japanese: ひさびさ実家帰ったらあるある ; Hepburn: Hi sabi-sa jikka kaettara aru aru	Wataru Hiranami_{[ja]}	Yugo Sakamoto_{[ja]}	Oct 16, 2024	
8	"No thanks to growth or experience"	Japanese: 経験も成長もしたくありません ; Hepburn: Keiken mo seichō mo shitaku arimasen	Yugo Sakamoto_{[ja]} / Wataru Kudo	Yugo Sakamoto_{[ja]}	Oct 23, 2024	
9	"All I know is killing"	Japanese: 殺ししかできないから ; Hepburn: Koroshi shika dekinaikara	Wataru Kudo / Kensuke Sonomura_{[ja]} (Action)	Yugo Sakamoto_{[ja]}	Oct 30, 2024	
10	"You just handle the killing"	Japanese: そっちは殺しだけでいいけど ; Hepburn: Sotchi wa koroshi dakede īkedo	Wataru Hiranami_{[ja]} / Kensuke Sonomura_{[ja]} (Action)	Yugo Sakamoto_{[ja]}	Nov 6, 2024	
11	"Why am I an assassin?"	Japanese: 私はなんで殺し屋をしてるのか ; Hepburn: Watashi wa nande koroshi-ya o shi teru no ka	Yugo Sakamoto_{[ja]} / Kensuke Sonomura_{[ja]} (Action)	Yugo Sakamoto_{[ja]}	Nov 13, 2024	
12	"Facing the future together"	Japanese: 未来の話も二人でなら ; Hepburn: Mirai no hanashi mo futari denara	Yugo Sakamoto_{[ja]} / Kensuke Sonomura_{[ja]} (Action)	Yugo Sakamoto_{[ja]}	Nov 20, 2024	

== Home media releases ==
A Blu-ray and a DVD box set containing the twelve episodes and special features were released on March 19, 2025.

== Manga adaptation ==
U-NEXT Publishing released a manga adaptation of the series in 2025, illustrated by Kazuno Yuikawa_{[ja]} and supervised by Yugo Sakamoto_{[ja]}.
