= Akari Takaishi =

Japanese actress (born 2002)

- 髙石あかり
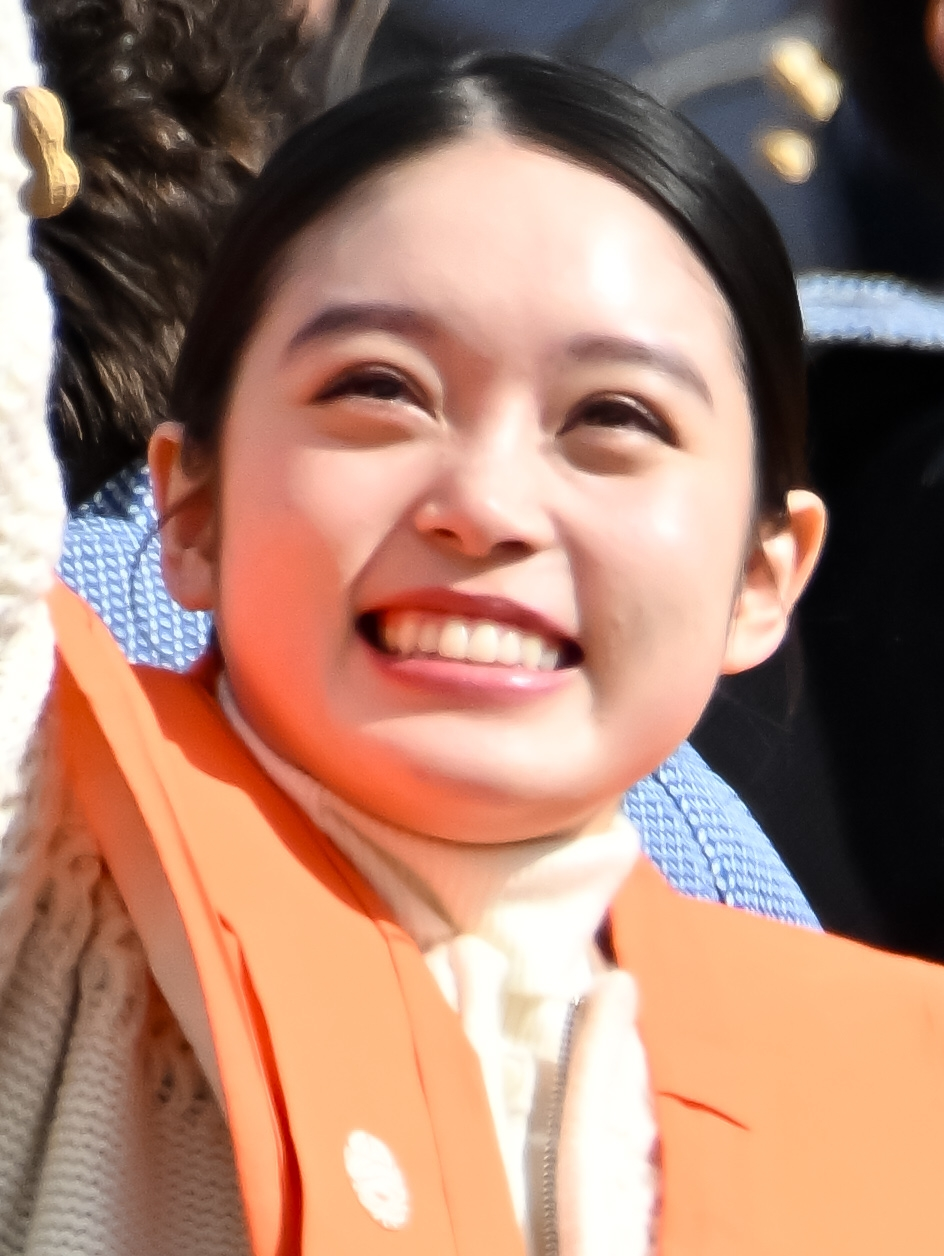
- Takaishi in 2026
- Born: December 19, 2002 (age 23); Miyazaki Prefecture, Japan
- Occupation: Actress
- Years active: 2014–present
- Agent: Avex Management

Akari Takaishi (髙石あかり, Takaishi Akari; born December 19, 2002) is a Japanese actress.

== Biography ==
In 2014, Takaishi entered a contest held by Avex and debuted in the entertainment industry. She was a member of the dance-vocal group "α-X's" but left in 2018. The following year, she announced that she would focus mainly on her acting. She gained recognition through the Baby Assassins film series. In 2024, she won an audition against 2,892 participants, landing her dream role as the heroine of an Asadora.

== Filmography ==
=== Film ===
Year	Title	Role	Notes	Ref.
2017	Sound of Waves	Yukari		
2019	Women's Baseball	Ichika		
2021	A Janitor	Rika		
2021	Baby Assassins	Chisato Sugimoto	Lead role	
2022	Tsuisō Journey	Kurumi		
2022	Old School	Rin Ishioka		
2023	Single8	Natsumi		
2023	As Long as We Both Shall Live	Kaya Saimori		
2023	Baby Assassins: 2 Babies	Chisato Sugimoto	Lead role	
2023	S-Friends 2	Saki Yamada		
2024	The Scoop	Kasane Sugihara		
2024	The Parades	Yasuko		
2024	The Colors Within	Kimi Sakunaga (voice)	Lead role	
2024	Stolen Identity: Final Hacking Game	Chiharu Seto		
2024	Baby Assassins: Nice Days	Chisato Sugimoto	Lead role	
2024	Documentary of Baby Assassins	Herself	Documentary	
2024	The Hotel of My Dream	Miwako Higashijujo		
2025	Suicide Notes Laid on the Table	Rina Mikado		
2025	Ghost Killer	Fumika Matsuoka	Lead role	
2025	Dream Animals: The Movie	Pegasus-chan (voice)		
2025	On Summer Sand	Yuko Kawakami		
2025	S-Friends 3	Saki Yamada		
2025	S-Friends 4	Saki Yamada		
2026	Mag Mag	Yui Teramoto		
2027	Saturday Night Theatre	Tsugumi Yamanaka	Lead role	

=== Television drama ===
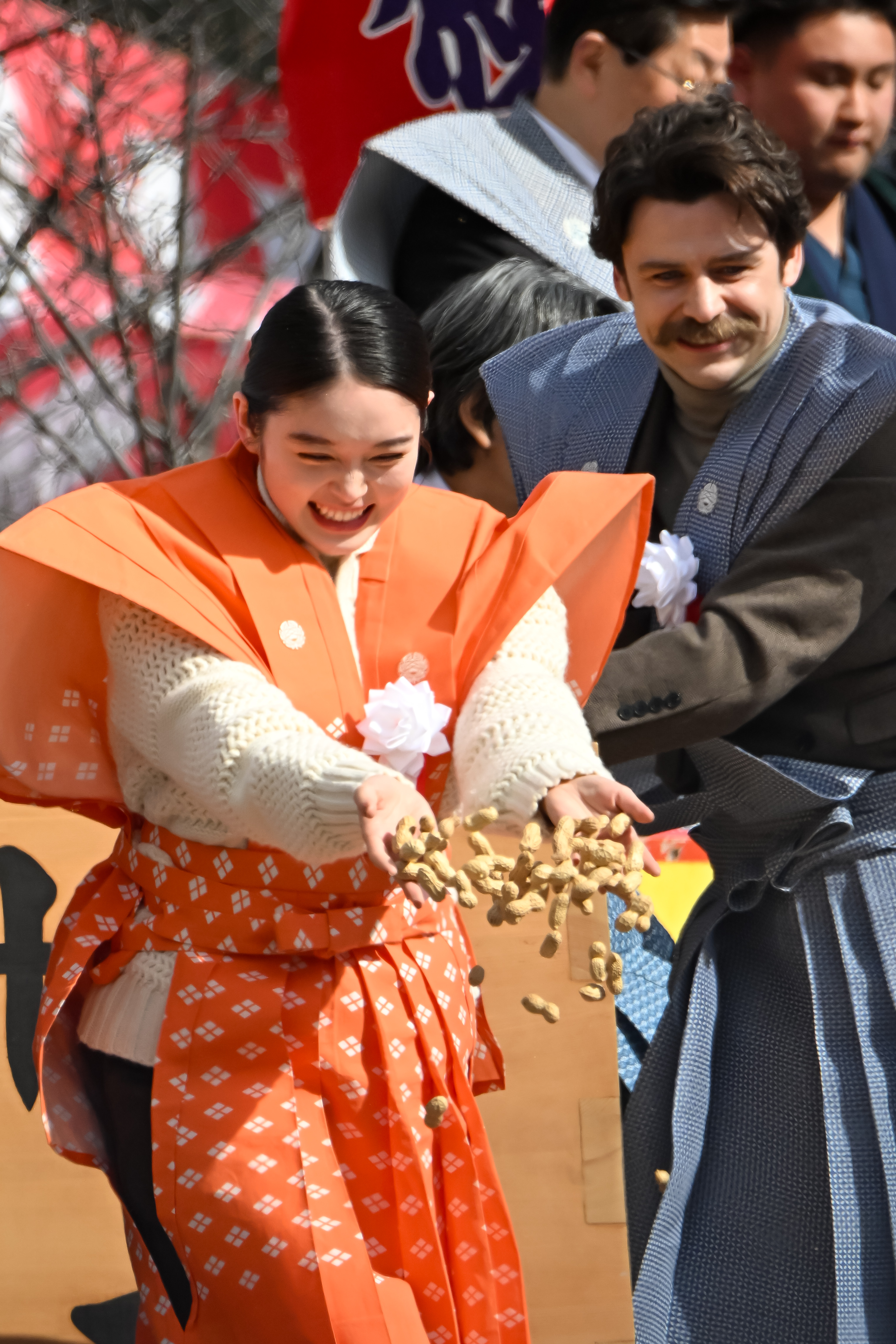
Takaishi with Tommy Bastow at Narita-san, 2026

Year	Title	Role	Notes	Ref.
2020	Secret × Heroine Phantomirage!	Rurie Takamuro	Episode 51	
2022	What Six Survivors Told	Beast Kashimoto		
2023	My Worst Friend	Miharu Kagiya		
2023–24	Falling High School Girl and Irresponsible Teacher	Mikoto Ochiai	2 seasons	
2024	Baby Assassins Everyday!	Chisato Sugimoto	Lead role	
2025	Mr. Mikami's Classroom	Haruka Chigira		
2025	Apollo's Song	Hiromi Watari	Lead role	
2025	Glass Heart	Yukino Sakurai		
2025–26	The Ghost Writer's Wife	Toki Matsuno	Lead role; Asadora	

=== Other ===
==== Television ====
Year	Title	Role	Notes	Ref.
2025	76th NHK Kōhaku Uta Gassen	Herself	As a judge	

==== Web ====
Year	Title	Role	Notes	Ref.
2026	The Open Call - Main Partner Takayuki Yamada	Herself		

=== Stage ===
Year	Title	Role	Notes	Ref.
2020–21	Demon Slayer: Kimetsu no Yaiba	Nezuko Kamado		
2021	Toilet-Bound Hanako-kun: The Musical	Nene Yashiro		

== Awards and nominations ==
Year	Award	Category	Nominated work(s)	Result	Ref.
2023	15th Tama Film Awards	Best New Actress	Baby Assassins: 2 Babies and others	Won	
2026	50th Elan d'or Awards	Elan d'or Award	Herself	Won	
