= Baby Assassins =

Japanese film series

- Poster for the first film, featuring lead characters Mahiro (left) and Chisato (right)
- Created by: Yugo Sakamoto
- Original work: Baby Assassins (2021)
- Owner: Shibuya Productions

Films and television
- Film(s): Baby Assassins (2021); Baby Assassins: 2 Babies (2023); Baby Assassins: Nice Days (2024)
- Television series: Baby Assassins Everyday! (2024)

Official website
- https://babywalkure.com/

Baby Assassins (Japanese: ベイビーわるきゅーれ, Hepburn: Beibī Warukyūre) is an action comedy crime film series written and directed by Yugo Sakamoto. The series follows two young women who work as contract killers, Mahiro Fukagawa (Saori Izawa) and Chisato Sugimoto (Akari Takaishi), as they struggle to adjust to modern society. The series, distributed in Japan by Shibuya Productions, consists of three films and a twelve-episode television drama.

== Films ==
=== Baby Assassins (2021) ===
The first film in the series, Baby Assassins (Japanese: ベイビーわるきゅーれ ; Hepburn: Beibī Warukyūre)_{[ja]}, was released in Japan on July 30, 2021. The story follows two young girls, Chisato and Mahiro, who work as contract killers while living together as roommates in Tokyo. After their handler at the organization employing them instructs them to get jobs, Mahiro and Chisato struggle with fitting into society due to their propensity to resolve their social difficulties with violence.

=== Baby Assassins: 2 Babies (2023) ===
The second film, Baby Assassins: 2 Babies (Japanese: ベイビーわるきゅーれ 2ベイビー ; Hepburn: Beibī Warukyūre 2 Beibī)_{[ja]} was released in Japan on March 24, 2023. The film continues to follow Chisato and Mahiro as they are hunted down by fellow assassins and brothers Makoto (Tatsuomi Hamada) and Yuri Kamimura (Joey Iwanaga). The film's theme song, "Jyanaindayo," was performed by idol group Atarashii Gakko!, who also make a cameo appearance in the film.

=== Baby Assassins: Nice Days (2024) ===
The third film, Baby Assassins: Nice Days (Japanese: ベイビーわるきゅーれ ナイスデイズ ; Hepburn: Beibī Warukyūre Naisu Deizu)_{[ja]} was released in Japan on September 27, 2024. Taking place in Miyazaki, the film follows Chisato and Mahiro as they encounter the bloodthirsty and zealous freelance assassin Kaede Fuyumura (Sosuke Ikematsu), who they must race to dispose of before he kills both of them.

== Television series ==
=== Baby Assassins Everyday! (2024) ===
A twelve-episode television drama series, Baby Assassins Everyday! (Japanese: ベイビーわるきゅーれ エブリデイ! ; Hepburn: Beibī Warukyūre Eburidei!)_{[ja]}, premiered on September 4, 2024, on TV Tokyo.

== Documentary ==
=== Documentary of Baby Assassins (2024) ===
The film Documentary of Baby Assassins (Japanese: ドキュメンタリー オブ ベイビーわるきゅーれ ; Hepburn: Dokyumentarī Obu Beibī Warukyūre) was released in Japan on October 4, 2024. Directed by Akihiro Takahashi, it is a behind-the-scenes documentary about the filming of Baby Assassins: Nice Days. It follows the production's rehearsals and shooting of principal photography in Miyazaki Prefecture, featuring interviews with the main cast (Akari Takaishi, Saori Izawa, Sosuke Ikematsu, Atsuko Maeda, and Mondo Otani), director Yugo Sakamoto, action director Kensuke Sonomura, and executive producer Yusuke Suzuki.

== Production ==
All three films are written and directed by Yugo Sakamoto, and feature action choreography by Kensuke Sonomura.

=== Baby Assassins (2021) ===
Crew:

- Directed, written and edited by Yugo Sakamoto
- Produced by: Yuji Okumura, Takeshi Hitomi, Ken Matsubara, Miokazu Kobayashi
- Executive Producer - Yusuke Suzuki
- Producers: Riku Tsunoda, Tsuyoshi Goto
- Action Director: Kensuke Sonomura
- Action Coordinator: Naohiro Kawamoto
- Music producer: Ken Matsubara
- Photography and lighting: Moritada Iju
- Sound: Takeshi Igarashi, Naka Ueda
- Art and decoration - Mirai Iwasaki

=== Baby Assassins: 2 Babies (2023) ===
Crew:

- Director and Screenwriter: Yugo Sakamoto
- Action Director: Kensuke Sonomura
- Produced by: Yuji Okumura, Takeshi Hitomi, Ken Matsubara, Miokazu Kobayashi
- Executive Producer - Yusuke Suzuki
- Producers: Riku Tsunoda, Tsuyoshi Goto
- Music producer: Ken Matsubara
- Music - SUPA LOVE
- Photography - Iju Moritada
- Lighting - Hiroki Hibino
- Recording - Takeshi Igarashi
- Art - Mirai Iwasaki

=== Baby Assassins: Nice Days (2024) ===
Crew:

- Director and Screenwriter: Yugo Sakamoto
- Assistant Director: Wataru Kudo
- Producers: Riku Sumida, Tsuyoshi Goto
- Executive Producer: Yusuke Suzuki
- Action Director: Kensuke Sonomura
- Action Coordinator: Naohiro Kawamoto
- Cinematography: Moritada Iju
- Lighting: Masafumi Seki
- Sound: Masato Komaki
- Music Producer: Ken Matsubara
- Music: SUPA LOVE
- Theme song: ZIYOOU-VACHI

== Reception ==
Robert Daniels of The New York Times regarded the first film in the series positively, describing it as "a colorful and wild blitzkrieg".

To commemorate the release of the second film, a stage greeting was held at Shinjuku Piccadilly in Tokyo on March 25, 2023. Featured in this event were the director Yugo Sakamoto, the lead duo Akari Takaishi and Saori Izawa, the antagonists Joey Iwanaga and Tatsuomi Hamada, Atomu Mizuishi, and the members of Atarashii Gakko!, who performed the theme song live on stage.

== Official website ==
- Official website
