= Garo: Yami o Terasu Mono =

Japanese tokusatsu TV series in the Garo franchise

- Promotional poster for Garo: Yami o Terasu Mono
- Genre: Horror, tokusatsu, Superhero
- Created by: Keita Amemiya
- Written by: Itaru Era; Makoto Yokoyama; Kei Taguchi; Hisako Fujihira; Sumiko Umeda
- Directed by: Makoto Yokoyama; Ryu Kaneda; Akihito Shimoda; Mitsuyoshi Abe; Yoshiomi Umetsu
- Starring: Wataru Kuriyama; Tsunenori Aoki; Junya Ikeda; Miki Nanri; Kohei Otomo; Hiroko Sato; Kanji Tsuda
- Voices of: Hironobu Kageyama
- Theme music composer: Yoshichika Kuriyama; Shiho Terada
- Opening theme: "Theme of Yami o Terasu Mono"; "Isshokusokuhatsu ~Trigger of Crisis~" by JAM Project
- Ending theme: "So Long" by Kohei Otomo; "PLATONIC" by JAM Project featuring Masami Okui
- Composer: Shunji Inoue
- Country of origin: Japan
- Original language: Japanese
- No. of episodes: 25 (list of episodes)

Production
- Production companies: Omnibus Japan, Tohokushinsha Film Corporation

Original release
- Network: TV Tokyo
- Release: April 5 – September 20, 2013

Related
- Garo: Makai Senki; Garo: Makai no Hana; GARO

Garo: Yami o Terasu Mono (牙狼〈GARO〉～闇を照らす者～; lit. "The One Who Shines in the Darkness") is a Japanese tokusatsu television series. that premiered on April 5, 2013, on TV Tokyo. Written and directed by Makoto Yokoyama, Yami o Terasu Mono is the third television series in the Garo metaseries, but is set in a different continuity than previous and following entries. The catchphrase for the series, referred to as the Vol City Chapter (ボルシティ篇, Boru Shiti-Hen), is "Get back your gold." (金色を、取り戻せ。, Konjiki o, Torimodose.).

== Story ==
Yami o Terasu Mono takes place at an alternative universe parallel to that of Saejimas' and focuses events on Vol City (ボルシティ, Boru Shiti), a metropolis built around a volcano and infested by evil demons known as Horrors. Ryuga Dougai, a Makai Knight who has inherited the title of Garo the Golden Knight, is tasked to hunt them down. However, the Garo Armor had long lost its golden radiance and it is not as powerful as it used to be. Joining forces with fellow Makai Knights Aguri and Takeru, along with Makai Priests Burai and Rian, Ryuga confronts the dark side of the city that is plagued by a rare breed of Horrors called Madō Horrors (魔導ホラー, Madō Horā), and the mystery behind why a portion of the Garo Armor's golden light is restored every time he destroys one of them.

== Sequel ==
Garo: Goldstorm Sho (牙狼〈GARO〉－GOLDSTORM－翔, Garo -GOLDSTORM- Shō) will be both a film and a television series that serve as sequels to Yami o Terasu Mono. Wataru Kuriyama and Miki Nanri reprise their roles and are joined by new cast members (among them is Masahiro Inoue as the series antagonist Jinga). The film adaptation was released in theatres on March 28, 2015, while the television series began broadcast on April 3, 2015.

== Cast ==
- Ryuga Dougai (道外 流牙, Dōgai Ryūga): Wataru Kuriyama (栗山 航, Kuriyama Wataru)
- Rian (莉杏): Miki Nanri (南里 美希, Nanri Miki)
- Aguri Kusugami (楠神 哀空吏, Kusugami Aguri): Tsunenori Aoki (青木 玄徳, Aoki Tsunenori)
- Takeru Jakuzure (蛇崩 猛竜, Jakuzure Takeru): Junya Ikeda (池田 純矢, Ikeda Jun'ya)
- Burai (符礼): Kohei Otomo (大友 康平, Ōtomo Kōhei)
- Enhou (燕邦, Enhō): Hiroko Sato (佐藤 寛子, Satō Hiroko)
- Rivera (リベラ, Ribera): Kumi Imura (井村 空美, Imura Kumi)
- Sonshi (尊士): Yasuaki Kurata (倉田 保昭, Yasuaki Kurata)
- Hakana (波奏): Megumi Yokoyama (横山 めぐみ, Yokoyama Megumi)
- Tousei Kaneshiro (金城 滔星, Kaneshiro Tōsei): Kanji Tsuda (津田 寛治, Tsuda Kanji)
- Madō Ring Zaruba (魔導輪ザルバ, Madōrin Zaruba; Voice): Hironobu Kageyama (影山 ヒロノブ, Kageyama Hironobu)

== Episodes ==
No.	Title	Written by	Original release date
1	"Ryuga"; Transliteration: "Ryūga" (Japanese: 流～Ryuga～)	Itaru Era; Makoto Yokoyama	April 5, 2013
2	"Gold wave" Transliteration: "Gōrudo wēbu" (Japanese: 波～Gold wave～)	Itaru Era	April 12, 2013
3	"Dungeon"; Transliteration: "Danjon" (Japanese: 迷～Dungeon～)	Kei Taguchi; Makoto Yokoyama	April 19, 2013
4	"Dream"; Transliteration: "Dorīmu" (Japanese: 夢～Dream～)	Hisako Fujihira; Makoto Yokoyama	April 26, 2013
5	"Nightmare"; Transliteration: "Naitomea" (Japanese: 夢～Nightmare～)	Hisako Fujihira; Makoto Yokoyama	May 3, 2013
6	"Rock"; Transliteration: "Rokku" (Japanese: 響～Rock～)	Kei Taguchi	May 10, 2013
7	"Dining"; Transliteration: "Dainingu" (Japanese: 住～Dining～)	Itaru Era	May 17, 2013
8	"Scoop"; Transliteration: "Sukūpu" (Japanese: 乱～Scoop～)	Itaru Era	May 24, 2013
9	"Sonshi"; Transliteration: "Sonshi" (Japanese: 乱～Sonshi～)	Itaru Era	May 31, 2013
10	"Promise"; Transliteration: "Puromisu" (Japanese: 誓～Promise～)	Kei Taguchi	June 7, 2013
11	"Desire"; Transliteration: "Dezaia" (Japanese: 虜～Desire～)	Hisako Fujihira	June 14, 2013
12	"Trap"; Transliteration: "Torappu" (Japanese: 報～Trap～)	Hisako Fujihira	June 21, 2013
13	"Hunting"; Transliteration: "Hantingu" (Japanese: 狩～Hunting～)	Sumiko Umeda	June 28, 2013
14	"Hyena"; Transliteration: "Haiena" (Japanese: 腐～Hyena～)	Hisako Fujihira	July 5, 2013
15	"Hint"; Transliteration: "Hinto" (Japanese: 謎～Hint～)	Kei Taguchi	July 12, 2013
16	"Lost"; Transliteration: "Rosuto" (Japanese: 友～Lost～)	Itaru Era	July 19, 2013
17	"Tousei"; Transliteration: "Tōsei" (Japanese: 裏～Tousei～)	Itaru Era	July 26, 2013
18	"War"; Transliteration: "Wō" (Japanese: 闘～War～)	Kei Taguchi	August 2, 2013
19	"Hope"; Transliteration: "Hōpu" (Japanese: 光～Hope～)	Kei Taguchi	August 9, 2013
20	"Mother"; Transliteration: "Mazā" (Japanese: 母～Mother～)	Itaru Era; Hisako Fujihira	August 16, 2013
21	"Justice"; Transliteration: "Jasutisu" (Japanese: 義～Justice～)	Itaru Era; Hisako Fujihira	August 23, 2013
22	"Master"; Transliteration: "Masutā" (Japanese: 礼～Master～)	Itaru Era	August 30, 2013
23	"Gold"; Transliteration: "Gōrudo" (Japanese: 輝～Gold～)	Itaru Era; Makoto Yokoyama	September 6, 2013
24	"Future"; Transliteration: "Fyūchā" (Japanese: 照～Future～)	Itaru Era; Makoto Yokoyama	September 13, 2013
25	"Beginning"; Transliteration: "Biginingu" (Japanese: 道～Beginning～)	Itaru Era; Makoto Yokoyama	September 20, 2013

== Songs ==
Opening themes

- "Theme of Yami o Terasu Mono" (THEME OF 闇を照らす者)
  - Composition: Yoshichika Kuriyama, Shiho Terada
  - Episodes: 1–12, 24
- "Isshokusokuhatsu ~Trigger of Crisis~" (一触即発 ～Trigger of Crisis～)
  - Lyrics & Composition: Hironobu Kageyama
  - Arrangement: Yoshichika Kuriyama, Shiho Terada
  - Artist: JAM Project
  - Episodes: 13–23
  In episode 24, it is used as the ending theme.

Ending themes

- "So Long"
  - Composition & Arrangement: Yūji Toriyama
  - Lyrics & Artist: Kohei Otomo
  - Episodes: 1–12, 22
- "PLATONIC"
  - Lyrics & Composition: Masami Okui
  - Arrangement: Yoshichika Kuriyama, Shiho Terada
  - Artist: JAM Project featuring Masami Okui
  - Episodes: 13–21, 23
- "Brave Heart"
  - Composition & Arrangement: Yūji Toriyama
  - Lyrics & Artist: Kohei Otomo
  - Episodes: 25

JAM Project, performer on the theme songs for all previous entries in the franchise, will also perform the series theme songs. Kageyama, a member of the cast and JAM Project, says that the song he has written has already put him in tears in how much it has moved him.
