= Akira Ohashi =

Japanese actor

- 大橋明
- Born: June 6, 1968 (age 58); Japan
- Occupation: Actor
- Years active: 1991–present
- Known for: Gamera
- Height: 1.63 m (5 ft 4 in)

Akira Ohashi (大橋明, Ōhashi Akira) (born June 6, 1968) is a Japanese actor known in the west for his performances in tokusatsu media.

== Filmography ==
=== Film ===
Year	Title	Role	Ref(s)
1991	Zeiram	Iria	
1994	Zeiram 2	Iria	
1996	Gamera 2: Attack of Legion	Gamera	
1999	Gamera 3: Revenge of Iris	Iris	
2001	Godzilla, Mothra and King Ghidorah: Giant Monsters All-Out Attack	King Ghidorah	
2005	Kamen Rider The First	Spider	
2006	Kamen Rider The Next		
2013	Garo Gaiden: Tōgen no Fue	Director	
2015	Bikû	Director	
2019	VAMP	Action Director	
2021	Nezura 1964	Mammoth Nezura (motion capture)	

=== Television ===
Year	Title	Role	Ref(s)
2006	Garo		
2025	Kirio Fan Club	Kanta Morino	
