= Kei Taguchi =

Japanese actor (1933–2026)

- 田口 計
- Born: Katsuhiko Iwata; 10 January 1933; Nagano Prefecture, Japan
- Died: 27 January 2026 (aged 93)
- Occupation: Actor
- Years active: 1955–2026

Katsuhiko Iwata (岩田 克彦, Katsuhiko Iwata; 10 January 1933 – 27 January 2026), also known as Kei Taguchi (田口 計, Kei Taguchi), was a Japanese actor. He is most famous for playing villains and appeared in many jidaigeki and detective television dramas as a guest. He is also known as voice actor. Taguchi graduated from University of Tokyo.His career as a screen actor started in 1955. His first film appearance was in the 1955 film Aisureba Koso directed by Satsuo Yamamoto.

His son Kazuki Iwata is also actor. Taguchi died on 27 January 2026, at the age of 93.

== Filmography ==
=== Films ===
- An Actress (1956)
- Lucky Dragon No. 5 (film) (1959)
- Akitsu Springs (1962)
- King Kong Escapes (1967)
- Soshiki Bōryoku Kyodaijingi (1969)
- Tokyo Blackout (1987)

=== Television drama ===
- Akō Rōshi (1964)
- Hissatsu Shiokinin (1972) episode 18 Guest starring
- The Water Margin (1973),
- Mito Kōmon (1973~2011) 29 appearances as a Guest
- Taiyō ni Hoero! (1973~1984) episode 108,279,357,592 Guest starring
- G-Men '75 (1978–81) episode 137,179,275,315,341 Guest starring
- Hissatsu Shiokiya Kagyō (1975) episode 8 Guest starring
- Shin Hissatsu Shiokinin (1977) episode 11 Guest starring
- Hissatsu Karakurinin Fugakuhiyakkei Koroshitabi (1978)) episode 12 Guest starring
- Abarenbō Shōgun (1978–2000) 32 appearances as a Guest

== Voice acting ==
=== Anime ===
- Super Jetter, Jaguar

=== Dubbing ===
- Nixon, Richard Nixon (Anthony Hopkins)
- Raiders of the Lost Ark (1985 Nippon TV edition), René Belloq (Paul Freeman)
