= Korangal Valley campaign =

Military operations by ISAF against the Taliban

Korangal valley campaign
- Part of the War in Afghanistan (2001–2021)
Date	October 2004 – April 14, 2010
Location	Korangal Valley, Kunar province, Afghanistan
Result	US withdrawal Taliban strategic victory

Belligerents
United States; Islamic Republic of Afghanistan	(Afghanistan) Taliban

Strength
(United States) 600 soldiers	Unknown

Casualties and losses
(United States) 54 killed (United States) Several hundred wounded (Afghanistan) Heavy	Unknown

The Korangal Valley campaign was a series of military operations conducted by ISAF forces against Taliban and other local insurgents in the Korangal Valley in Kunar province, Afghanistan, from October 2004 to April 2010. The campaign ended with a US withdrawal from the valley, after suffering heavy casualties, and a Taliban takeover of the area.

Army Special Forces and Rangers had conducted an unknown number of missions there before October 2004 when 3rd Battalion 6th Marines became the first Marine unit to conduct an operation there, followed by 3rd Battalion 3rd Marines the next month, which began conducting regular combat operations. On June 28, 2005, a US Joint Military Operation called Operation Red Wings, was conducted in Korangal in an attempt to find and eliminate a local warlord. A four-man team of Navy SEALs was ambushed on a ridge above the village of Salar Ban; three members were killed, and a Chinook helicopter sent to rescue them was shot down, killing another 16 soldiers, including eight more Navy SEALs. The fourth member of the team was missing in action for several days before being rescued.

In April 2006, 1-32IN, 3rd BCT, 10th MTN, built a base at a sawmill and lumberyard in the valley and used them to build the Korengal Outpost. After that, they continued in an attempt to enter the six-mile-long by 0.62 mile-wide valley, but never made it more than halfway. The only area that US forces controlled was the northern part, while the southern part of the valley was under Taliban control from start to finish. There were only two missions to the valley’s southern end since 2005. In the words of the executive officer of Second Battalion, 12th Infantry Regiment, it would have taken a battalion-size force to make a foray there.

Most of the opposition encountered by Coalition troops were not Taliban or Al Qaeda members, but the Korengalis themselves. From time to time, some Taliban forces and al-Qaeda operatives passed through the valley, but the hostility mostly came from the valley's inhabitants. Later on, the Korangalis joined the insurgency. The valley was used as a route for fighters and weapons carriers to infiltrate Afghanistan.

US positions were attacked with rockets and mortars on an almost daily basis, and patrols were routinely ambushed after advancing only a few hundred meters outside the wire.

After years of sustained fighting and casualties with little evident progress, the US military closed Korangal Outpost on April 14, 2010, a decision made by Gen. Stanley McChrystal. Five days after the US retreat, a video aired by Al Jazeera showed Taliban fighters among the remains of the former American outpost. Throughout the five-year campaign, the United States lost 54 men killed and some hundreds wounded, primarily between the years of 2006 and 2009. Afghan soldiers took heavier casualties, partly because of their poorer equipment. The valley was dubbed "The Valley of Death" by American forces.

For his actions during Operation Rock Avalanche in October 2007, Staff Sergeant Salvatore Giunta received the United States military's highest decoration for valor, the Medal of Honor. He was the first living person since the Vietnam War to receive the award. When his patrol was ambushed on October 25, 2007, Giunta managed to save his team's sergeant, Joshua Brennan, from being dragged away and captured by two Taliban fighters. When Giunta saw Brennan being taken away, after he was wounded in the initial burst of fire, he rushed the enemy, killing one of the fighters and wounding the second. After that, he carried his sergeant to safety, but Brennan died of his wounds a few days later.

British professional photographer Tim Hetherington won the World Press Photo award for 2008 with a shot he took while reporting on the war in the Korangal Valley for Vanity Fair magazine in January 2008. Sebastian Junger's (2010) book War and the subsequent film Restrepo document his experiences while embedded with a US Army company in the Korangal valley.

== See also ==
- Operation Rock Avalanche American operation in the Korengal Valley in October 2007.
- Death of Linda Norgrove, Scottish aid worker held by Taliban forces in the Korangal Valley.
- Salvatore Giunta, Medal of Honor
- Firebase Phoenix A satellite installation of the Korangal Outpost, along with FB Vegas, OP Restrepo, and OP Dallas.
- Restrepo (film) Documentary about B Company's deployment to the Korangal Valley, including Operation Rock Avalanche.
- Korangal Valley
