= Ryan M. Pitts =

United States Army Medal of Honor recipient

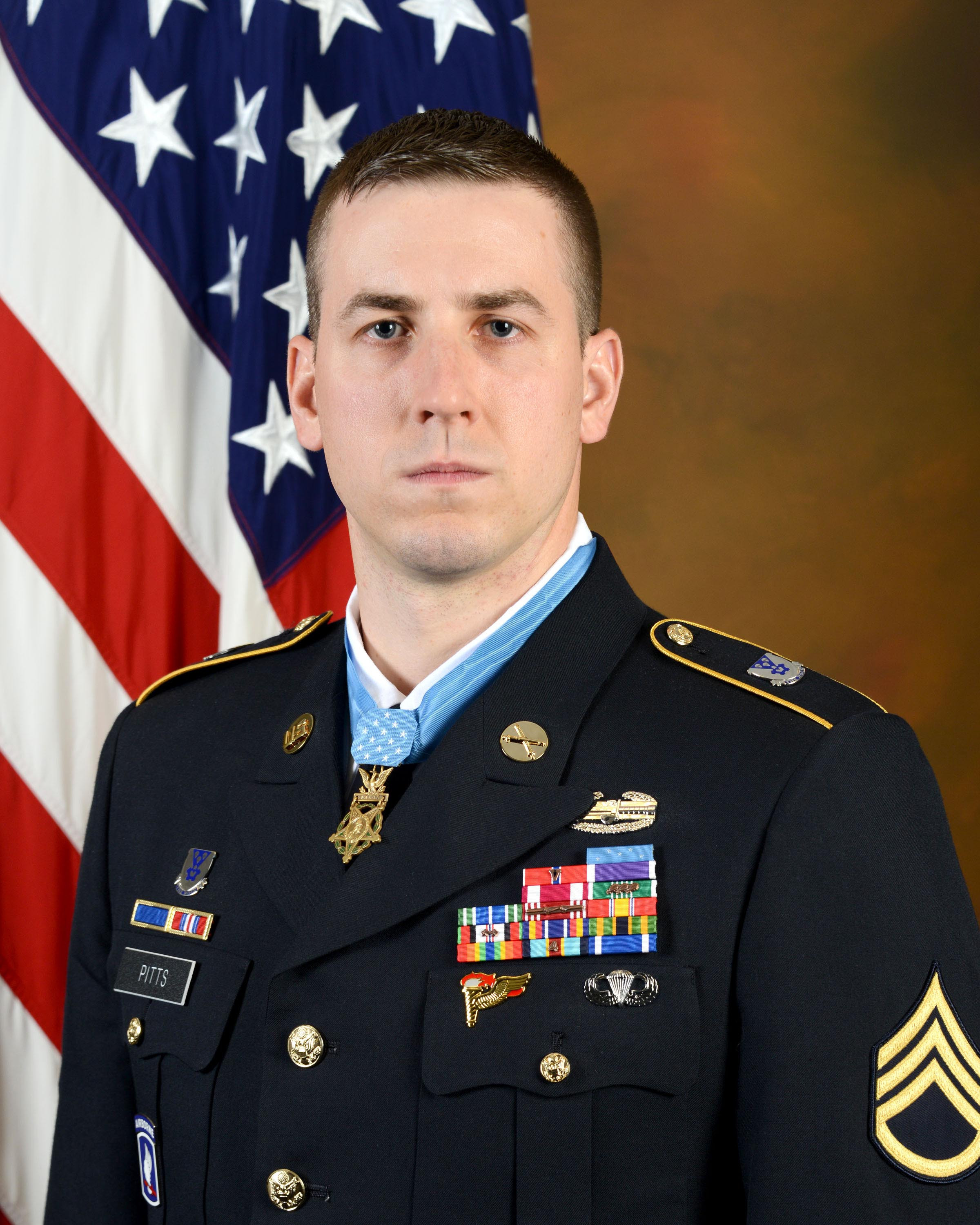
- Pitts in July 2014
- Born: October 1, 1985 (age 41); Lowell, Massachusetts, United States
- Spouse: Amy Pitts (m. 2012)
- Military career
- Allegiance: United States
- Branch: United States Army
- Service years: 2003–2009
- Rank: Staff Sergeant
- Units: 319th Field Artillery Regiment; 2nd Battalion, 503rd Infantry Regiment, 173rd Airborne Brigade
- Conflicts: War in Afghanistan: Battle of Wanat
- Awards: Medal of Honor; Bronze Star Medal; Purple Heart

Ryan Pitts (born October 1, 1985) is a former United States Army soldier and the ninth living recipient of the Medal of Honor from the War in Afghanistan.

== Early life ==
Pitts lives in Nashua, New Hampshire, and grew up "all over New England", including Mont Vernon, New Hampshire. As a child, in kindergarten, Pitts wanted to join the army. In 2003, he graduated from Souhegan High School.

== Military service ==
Pitts joined the United States Army in 2003 and attended One Station Unit Training at Fort Sill. After completing training Pitts was assigned to the 319th Field Artillery Regiment until 2005; afterwards he was assigned to the 503rd Infantry Regiment, 173rd Airborne Brigade, until 2009. During his time in the army, Pitt deployed twice to Afghanistan: in 2005 for 12 months, and in 2007 for 15 months. As part of the 503rd, Sergeant Pitts served as a Forward Observer.

Initially Pitts was recommended to receive a Distinguished Service Cross, for his actions on July 13, 2008, during the Battle of Wanat. He was awarded the Medal of Honor on July 21, 2014. Along with Salvatore Giunta and Kyle J. White, Pitts is the third recipient of the Medal of Honor from 2nd Battalion, 503rd Infantry Regiment.

== Post-military life ==
Pitts was medically discharged in 2009.

Pitts graduated from the University of New Hampshire at Manchester with a bachelor's degree in business. He works in business development for Oracle.

In 2015, Pitts was proclaimed as "New Englander of the Year" by his alma mater.

== Personal life ==
Pitts lives in Nashua, New Hampshire, with his wife Amy and son, Lucas. Pitts describes himself as a "private" individual, who does not enjoy the limelight.

== Awards and decorations ==
=== Military awards ===
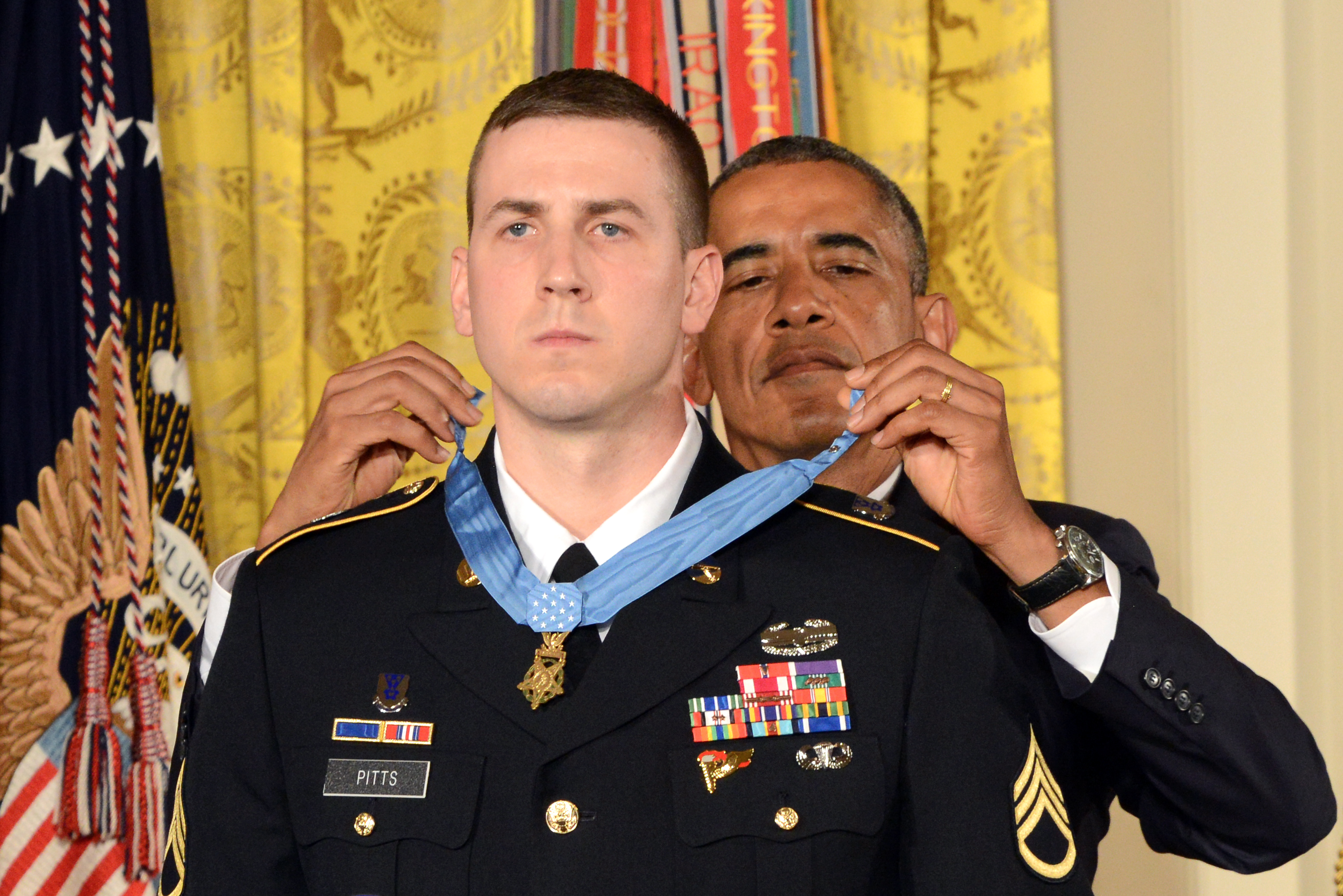
Pitts receiving the Medal of Honor from President Obama

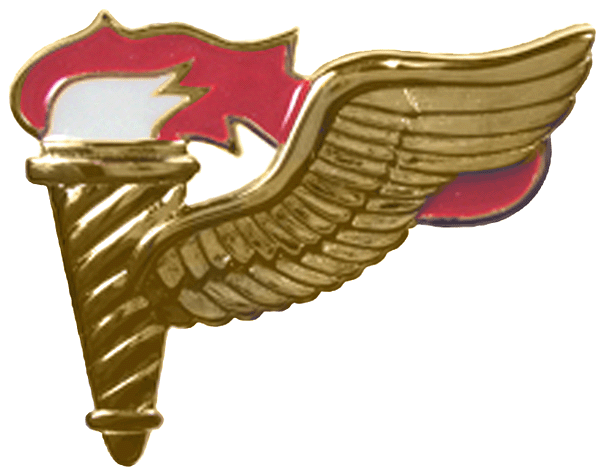

Right breast		Left breast		
Army Presidential Unit Citation	Valorous Unit Award	Combat Action Badge		
Army Presidential Unit Citation	Valorous Unit Award	Medal of Honor	Bronze Star with "V" device	Purple Heart
Army Presidential Unit Citation	Valorous Unit Award	Meritorious Service Medal	Army Commendation Medal with 3 bronze Oak leaf clusters (4 awards)	Army Achievement Medal
Army Presidential Unit Citation	Valorous Unit Award	Army Good Conduct Medal with 2 bronze Good conduct loops (2 awards)	National Defense Service Medal	Afghanistan Campaign Medal with 2 campaign stars
Army Presidential Unit Citation	Valorous Unit Award	Global War on Terrorism Expeditionary Medal	Global War on Terrorism Service Medal	NCO Professional Development Ribbon with award numeral 2
Army Presidential Unit Citation	Valorous Unit Award	Army Service Ribbon	Army Overseas Service Ribbon with award numeral 4	NATO Medal for ex-Yugoslavia
Army Presidential Unit Citation	Valorous Unit Award	Pathfinder Badge		Basic Parachutist Badge

- Staff Sergeant Pitts has also been awarded 2 service stripes and 4 Overseas Service Bars.

=== Medal of Honor citation ===

The President of the United States of America, authorized by Act of Congress, March 3, 1863, has awarded in the name of Congress the Medal of Honor to

SERGEANT RYAN M. PITTS
UNITED STATES ARMY

For conspicuous gallantry and intrepidity at the risk of his life above and beyond the call of duty:

Sergeant Ryan M. Pitts distinguished himself by extraordinary acts of heroism at the risk of his life above and beyond the call of duty while serving as a Forward Observer in 2d Platoon, Chosen Company, 2d Battalion (Airborne), 503d Infantry Regiment, 173d Airborne Brigade, during combat operations against an armed enemy at Vehicle Patrol Base Kahler vicinity of Wanat Village, Kunar Province, Afghanistan on July 13, 2008. Early that morning, while Sergeant Pitts was providing perimeter security at Observation Post Topside, a well-organized Anti-Afghan Force consisting of over 200 members initiated a close proximity sustained and complex assault using accurate and intense rocket-propelled grenade, machine gun and small arms fire on Wanat Vehicle Patrol Base. An immediate wave of rocket-propelled grenade rounds engulfed the Observation Post wounding Sergeant Pitts and inflicting heavy casualties. Sergeant Pitts had been knocked to the ground and was bleeding heavily from shrapnel wounds to his arm and legs, but with incredible toughness and resolve, he subsequently took control of the observation post and returned fire on the enemy. As the enemy drew nearer, Sergeant Pitts threw grenades, holding them after the pin was pulled and the safety lever was released to allow a nearly immediate detonation on the hostile forces. Unable to stand on his own and near death because of the severity of his wounds and blood loss, Sergeant Pitts continued to lay suppressive fire until a two-man reinforcement team arrived. Sergeant Pitts quickly assisted them by giving up his main weapon and gathering ammunition all while continually lobbing fragmentary grenades until these were expended. At this point, Sergeant Pitts crawled to the northern position radio and described the situation to the command post as the enemy continued to try and isolate the Observation Post from the main Patrol Base. With the enemy close enough for him to hear their voices and with total disregard for his own life, Sergeant Pitts whispered in radio situation reports and conveyed information that the Command Post used to provide indirect fire support. Sergeant Pitts' courage, steadfast commitment to the defense of his unit and ability to fight while seriously wounded prevented the enemy from overrunning the observation post and capturing fallen American soldiers, and ultimately prevented the enemy from gaining fortified positions on higher ground from which to attack Wanat Vehicle Patrol Base. Sergeant Ryan M. Pitts' extraordinary heroism and selflessness above and beyond the call of duty are in keeping with the highest traditions of military service and reflect great credit upon himself, Company C, 2d Battalion (Airborne), 503d Infantry Regiment, 173d Airborne Brigade and the United States Army.

== See also ==
- List of Afghanistan Medal of Honor recipients
