= Restrepo (film) =

2010 documentary film by Tim Hetherington and Sebastian Junger

- Directed by: Tim Hetherington; Sebastian Junger
- Produced by: Tim Hetherington; Sebastian Junger
- Cinematography: Sebastian Junger; Tim Hetherington; Jake Clennell (Italy Interviews)
- Edited by: Michael Levine
- Production company: Outpost Films
- Distributed by: National Geographic Entertainment
- Release dates: January 21, 2010 (Sundance); June 25, 2010 (United States)
- Running time: 93 minutes
- Country: United States
- Language: English
- Box office: $1,436,391 (worldwide)

Restrepo is a 2010 American documentary film about the War in Afghanistan directed by British photojournalist Tim Hetherington and American journalist Sebastian Junger. It explores the year that Junger and Hetherington spent, on assignment for Vanity Fair, in Afghanistan's Korengal Valley, embedded with the Second Platoon, B Company, 2nd Battalion, 503rd Infantry Regiment, 173rd Airborne Brigade Combat Team of the U.S. Army. The Second Platoon is depicted defending the outpost (OP) named after a platoon medic who was killed earlier in the campaign, PFC Juan Sebastián Restrepo, who was a Colombian-born naturalized U.S. citizen. The directors stated that the film is not a war advocacy documentary, they simply "wanted to capture the reality of the soldiers."

== Plot ==
After some footage of four inebriated soldiers filmed by PFC Juan Sebastián Restrepo a week before deployment, text is displayed that reads: "In May 2007, the men of Second Platoon, Battle Company began a 15 month deployment in the Korengal Valley of eastern Afghanistan. It was considered one of the most dangerous postings in the U.S. Military." The Korengal flows north to the Pech, which then flows east to the Kunar River Valley on Afghanistan's porous border with Pakistan. American soldiers and supplies were ferried into the remote Combat Outpost (COP) Korengal by Chinook helicopters. As an example of the ever-present dangers faced by the soldiers in the area, the first scene in the film that takes place in Afghanistan depicts a fire-fight after a military Hummer is disabled on a narrow mountain road by an IED.

The remainder of the film chronicles the lives of the men of Second Platoon from a few months after their arrival in the Korengal Valley to the time of their return home. Early in their deployment, Pfc. Timothy R. Vimoto, 19, was killed in action, and the unit lost PFC Restrepo, their medic, shortly after. When Capt. Dan Kearney decided to construct an advanced outpost, the men chose to call it "OP Restrepo" in honor of their fallen comrade Juan Restrepo who so many have come to build a strong relationship with, which is where most of the film takes place. At Restrepo, the men came under fire almost daily, and often multiple times in a single day, from shifting enemy positions in the surrounding landscape.

In addition to interrupting the flow of Taliban troops and weapons through the Korengal Valley, a major goal for the American troops was to provide security for the construction of a road and gain the trust of the populace. The film portrays negotiations and interactions between the soldiers and local leaders and citizens, some of which are congenial, and some of which are more antagonistic.

A significant portion of the second half of the film consists of a depiction of Operation Rock Avalanche, which took place in October 2007. During the dangerous mission to hunt Taliban fighters in the Korengal Valley, Battle Company lost Staff Sergeant Larry Rougle during an ambush by a large number of enemies. SSG Rougle was at point and took the brunt of the attack, allowing his soldiers to secure a position and fight. A recipient of the Purple Heart who served two tours in Iraq and three in Afghanistan, SSG Rougle was subsequently buried in Arlington National Cemetery.

According to Junger, Restrepo is a film, not just about the events of combat, but also about "brotherhood", and it shows the soldiers' dedication to their duty, as well as their commitment to one another. Interspersed throughout the film are excerpts from interviews recorded with some of the soldiers after Second Platoon returned to the 173rd Airborne Brigade Combat Team's base near Vicenza, Italy, in which the men candidly reflect on their experiences, feelings about those who were wounded or killed, and the emotional distress they will carry with them.

Before the credits roll, text is displayed that reads: "In April 2010, the United States withdrew from the Korengal Valley. Nearly 50 American soldiers died fighting there."

== Post-film events ==
For his actions during Operation Rock Avalanche, Staff Sergeant Salvatore Giunta from 2nd Battalion, who is not featured in the film, would later become the first living person to receive the Medal of Honor since the Vietnam War. Sergeant Kyle J. White (also from 2nd Battalion, but not featured in the film) later received the Medal of Honor for his actions during the Battle of Aranas on November 9, 2007.

On 20 April 2011, Tim Hetherington (one of the directors, producers, and cinematographers of Restrepo) was killed by shrapnel from either a mortar shell or an RPG fired by Libyan forces while covering the First Libyan Civil War.

== Reception ==
The film received the Grand Jury Prize: Documentary at the 2010 Sundance Film Festival. On review aggregator website Rotten Tomatoes, it has a rating of 97% based on 117 reviews, with an average score of 8.1/10; the website's "critics consensus" reads: "Forsaking narrative structure for pure visceral power, Restrepo plunges viewers into the experiences of soldiers on the front lines of the Afghan War." On Metacritic, the film has a weighted average score of 85 out of 100, based on 33 critics.

Roger Ebert awarded the film four out of four, and numerous critics and publications included it in their lists of the best films of 2010. The National Board of Review named it one of the top documentary films of 2010, and it was nominated for the Academy Award for Best Documentary Feature at the 83rd Academy Awards, losing to Inside Job. At the 2011 News & Documentary Emmy Awards Ceremony, Restrepo editor Michael Levine received the Emmy Award for Outstanding Individual Achievement in a Craft: Editing.

== Sequel ==
In March 2014, Realscreen magazine revealed that Junger was working on a sequel to Restrepo, titled Korengal. The followup was released in theaters in New York on May 30, 2014, with a pay-VOD release following that September. Korengal "departs from the vérité style of the original somewhat, as it features an original score and some archival news footage", though nearly all of the footage consists of material from Hetherington and Junger's visits to the Korengal Valley in 2007 and 2008, and the subsequent interviews with soldiers done in Italy, that had not been used in Restrepo.

== See also ==
- 16 Days in Afghanistan, a frequently-referenced 2008 documentary about the country
- The Battle for Marjah, a 2010 HBO documentary covering the efforts of Bravo Company, 1st Battalion, 6th Marine Regiment, in Operation Moshtarak
- Armadillo, a 2010 Danish documentary about Danish troops stationed at "Armadillo" forward operating base in Helmand Province, Afghanistan

Awards
Preceded by We Live in Public	Sundance Grand Jury Prize: U.S. Documentary; 2010	Succeeded by How to Die in Oregon
