= Battle of Aranas =

2007 battle of the War in Afghanistan

- Part of the War in Afghanistan (2001-2021)
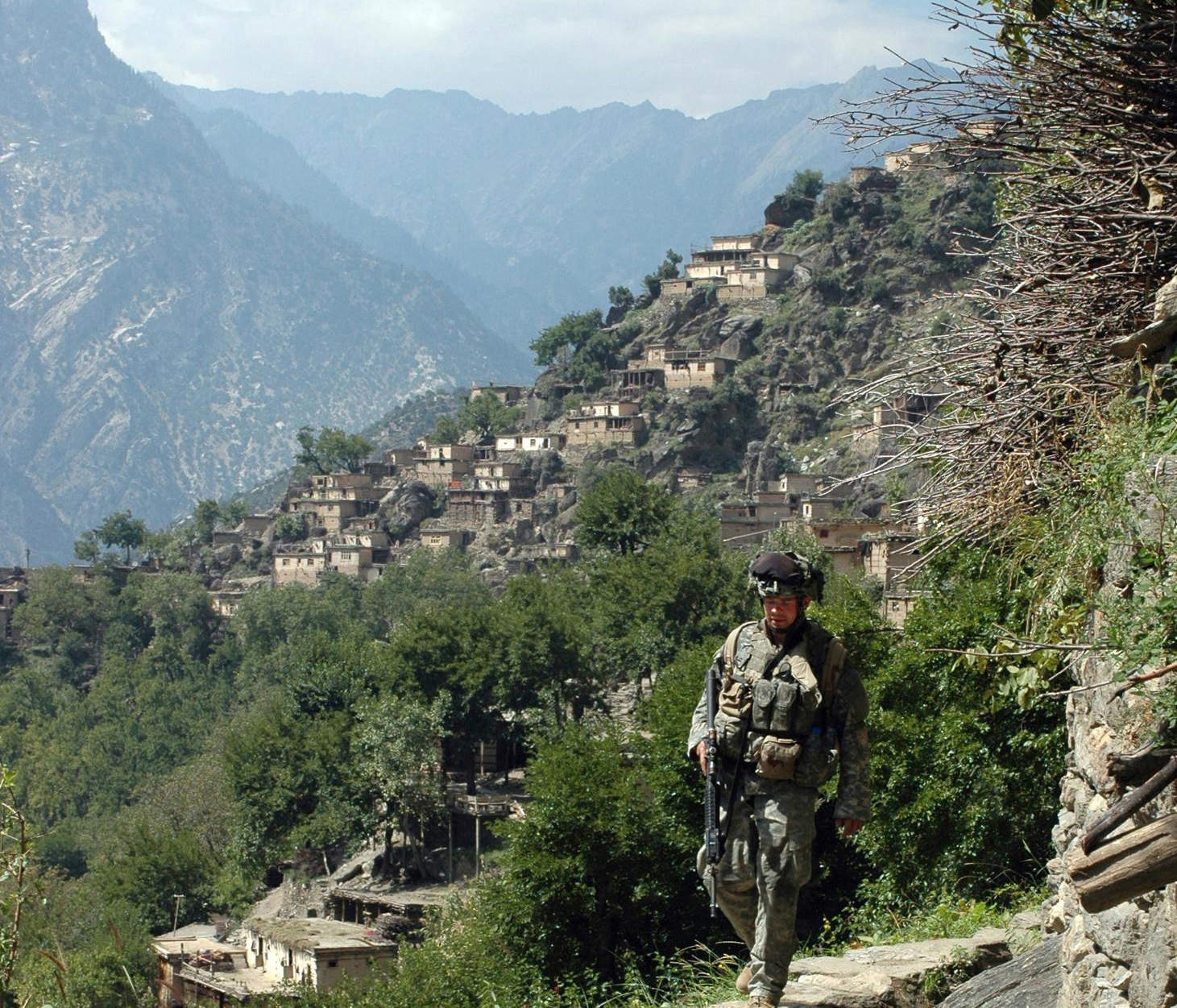
- Village of Aranas
Date	9 November 2007
Location	Nuristan Province, Afghanistan
Result	Taliban victory

Belligerents
United States; Afghanistan	Taliban

Commanders and leaders
1st Lt. Matthew C. Ferrara †; Sgt Kyle J. White) (WIA)	Unknown

Units involved
U.S. Army: 1st Platoon, Chosen Company; 2nd Battalion (Airborne); 503rd Infantry Regiment; 173rd Airborne Brigade; Afghan National Army	No specific units

Strength
United States: 14 soldiers Afghanistan: 14 soldiers	Unknown

Casualties and losses
United States: 6 killed 8 wounded Afghanistan: 3 killed 11 wounded	1 killed

The Aranas ambush was an attack by the Taliban against a US-Afghan patrol returning from a tribal meeting. The Taliban inflicted heavy casualties on US-Afghan forces, and the Americans managed to evacuate with their wounded in the darkness.

== Prelude ==
On November 8, 2007, members of the 1st Platoon, Chosen Company, 2nd Battalion (Airborne), 503rd Infantry Regiment, and 173rd Airborne Brigade moved to the village of Aranas in Nuristan Province to meet with the village chiefs. The American platoon consisted of two squads including 14 Americans alongside an Afghan-allied squad. They set out in darkness and arrived there, spending the rest of the day in the village. The next morning, the platoon met with the elders, but due to suspicion, the leader of the platoon, 1st Lt. Matthew C. Ferrara, ordered the platoon to go back.

== Ambush ==
The half strength platoon began descending from the village of Aranas into a valley, and after twenty minutes of walking down, Taliban forces launched a three-pronged ambush on the platoon using "a much larger and more heavily armed Taliban force" from an elevated position.

Taliban forces having complete tactical surprise peppered the platoon with multiple rounds of small arms fire, then it escalated with the use of RPGs which Sergeant Kyle J. White especially had a close encounter with, he recalls "An RPG hit right behind my head and knocked me unconscious ... it was just lights out ... when I woke up, I was face-down on a rock", more small arms exchanges followed when Sergeant Kyle J. White realized that "10 of the 14-man American element and the ANA soldiers were gone", they withdrew to lower ground (150 feet down the side of a rocky cliff) for better cover, meanwhile, the platoon leader 1st Lt. Ferrara, along with Sgt. Phillip A. Bocks, specialist Kain Schilling, an interpreter and Sergeant Kyle J. White, were effectively cut off from the rest sitting at the top of the valley, Sgt White then noticed that Spc. Schilling was wounded by a bullet to the upper right arm, he proceed to "dodge and weave" the incoming fire, running towards some shrubs and the "umbrella canopy" of a single prickly tree for cover, Sgt White also proceeded to that point hence allowing him to provide medical assistance to Spc. Schilling, they were effectively "invisible" as the shrubs and the "umbrella canopy" hid them from the view of Taliban fighters.

Sgt. White then recalls "As I was working on him, I had the radio on, then I rolled over and sat next to Schilling just to take my pack off, that's when I got that metallic taste, then that burning in my lungs" that was in fact his radio battery smoldering, thus effectively cutting communication, with this realization Sgt. White looked to his comrades and saw Sgt. Bocks lying wounded in the open "about 30 feet from the shade of the tree", Sgt. White in panic tried to encourage Sgt. Bocks to use all his strength but Sgt. Bocks could not make progress, Sgt. White recalls "I knew he needed help and there was a lot of fire coming in, but it really didn't matter at that point, but by then I already had known, 'well, shit, we're not gonna make it through this one; it's just a matter of time before I'm dead,'" he further expands "I figured, if that's going to happen, I might as well help someone while I can", a sentiment that is still the bedrock of US military comradery, Sgt. White not leaving his comrade to chance "sprinted the 30 feet to Bocks as rounds skipped around his feet and snapped past his head", however he did make to Sgt. Bocks unscathed, but to his chagrin, Sgt. Bocks wounds were quite severe, realizing this, Sgt. White proceeded to yell at interpreter to attend the soldier but the interpreter was pinned down by heavy Taliban small arms fire, Sgt. White recalls "At that time, I can remember thinking he wasn't going to make it, but I knew I wasn't going to stop trying" he later expands "No matter what the outcome, I'm going to do what I can with what I have", Sgt. White in act of bravery grabbed his teammate by carry handle on the back of Sgt. Bock's vest, again to his chagrin now the Taliban was directly targeting him and his teammate (further endangering the wounded Sgt. Bock), Sgt. White took cover and waited for the enemy fire to die down, running from Sgt. Bock to cover and back in process that took at least four times which culminated in Sgt. Bock finally reaching cover.

Now that Sgt. Bocks was in cover, Sgt. White could properly examine the damage, Sgt. Bocks was severely wounded in the leg, bleeding profusely, Sgt. White applied at least to tourniquets to stop the bleeding, then noticing an exit wound on the torso area, Sgt. White tore up Sgt. Bock's shirt open and saw that indeed it was an impact, and a large one at that, in a state of panic, Sgt. White proceed to do what he could to stop the bleeding, he stuffed bandages, clothing but no matter what he did, he could not stop the excessive bleeding, ultimately Sgt. Bocks succumbed to his wounds.

In a total state of shock, Sgt. White slowly started realizing the situation and no less than he did, Spc. Schilling was hit by small arms fire again, but this time on the left leg, scrambling to his comrade Sgt. White, out of tourniquets took his own belt and applied it around Schilling's leg, Sgt. White recalls "So, I put my foot on his leg and pulled the belt as hard as I could until the bleeding stopped", then assessing the situation Sgt. Bocks noticed that 1st Lt. Ferrara was "lying still, face-down on the trail", again in a heroic display of bravery, Sgt. White proceed to check up on the Lieutenant, but he had perished, thus Sgt. White withdrew back to cover, back to Spc. Schilling, returning to cover Sgt. White tried to use Spc. Schilling's radio until "an enemy round zipped right through the hand-mic blowing it out of his hand", again communication has been effectively cutoff.

Reassessing the situation Sgt. White noticed that Sgt. Bock's radio was still operational, he "established communication with friendly elements and rendered a situation report", thus requesting "mortars, artillery, air strikes and helicopter gun runs to keep the enemy from massing on friendly positions", he recalls "I heard a hiss, just a second of a hiss and then a big, big explosion and that one brought me to my knees" and later expands "It scrambled my brains a little bit", the concussion was caused by "a friendly 120-mm mortar round that fell a little short of its target".

The fighting continue into nightfall lasting more than 4 hours, Sgt. White "began giving the interpreter commands to relay to the Afghan National Army soldiers to establish themselves as a security perimeter", the MedEvac was still hours away, Sgt. White knowing this, kept Spc. Schilling awake as "he consolidated sensitive items -- radios and weapons in a central location to ensure no equipment would be lost to the enemy". Eventually, after the whole ordeal Sgt. White marked the landing zone for MedEvac and assisted the flight medic in hoisting the wounded into the helicopter, only after all wounded were off the trail did White allow himself to be evacuated.

The American forces had reported the lose of five infantry, one marine and eight wounded, while the Afghan allies lost three killed and 11 wounded. The Taliban reportedly lost only one man.

== Aftermath ==
The Aranas ambush marks 2007 as the deadliest year for the US in Afghanistan since the invasion in 2001. American dead rose to more than 100 in 2007.

Sergeant Kyle was awarded Medal of Honor for his actions on the battlefield.
