= Juan Restrepo =

Juan Restrepo may refer to:

- Juan Camilo Restrepo Salazar (born 1946), Colombian politician
- Juan David Restrepo (born 1979), Colombian actor
- Juan Sebastián Restrepo (1984–2007), Colombian-American soldier and medic
