= Korengal =

- Directed by: Sebastian Junger
- Produced by: Nick Quested
- Cinematography: Tim Hetherington; Sebastian Junger; Jake Clennell (Italy Interviews)
- Edited by: Michael Levine
- Music by: Marty Beller
- Production companies: Gold Crest Films, Outpost Films
- Release date: May 30, 2014 (United States)
- Running time: 84 minutes
- Country: United States
- Language: English
- Box office: $101,310

Korengal is a 2014 documentary about the War in Afghanistan directed by Sebastian Junger. It picks up where the film Restrepo (2010) left off, taking the viewer deeper into the experiences of the soldiers of Second Platoon, Battle Company, 2nd Battalion, 503rd Infantry Regiment, 173rd Airborne Brigade Combat Team of the U.S. Army while they were stationed in Korengal Valley of Kunar Province, in eastern Afghanistan in 2007-8. The film consists of footage of the soldiers during their deployment, as well as interviews conducted afterward. Most reviews of the film were favorable.

== Background ==
The film is composed primarily of footage shot by photojournalist Tim Hetherington and journalist Sebastian Junger in 2007 and 2008 during approximately 10 months spent with Second Platoon, Battle Company, 2nd Battalion, 503rd Infantry Regiment, 173rd Airborne Brigade Combat Team of the U.S. Army at Outpost (OP) Restrepo in Afghanistan's Korengal Valley, along with interviews recorded with some of the soldiers after Second Platoon returned to the 173rd Airborne Brigade Combat Team's base near Vicenza, Italy. Heatherington and Junger had already assembled the Academy Award-nominated 2010 documentary Restrepo from the same material, but after that film was completed there was still a considerable amount of footage left unused.

Hetherington was killed by shrapnel in April 2011 while reporting on the First Libyan Civil War, so Junger made Korengal as the sole director. Whereas Restrepo had been intended to make the viewer feel what it was like to be in combat, Junger's aim with Korengal was to delve deeper into the experience and emotions of those in combat and deconstruct what war does to the individual soldier. He said: "One of the things I wanted to communicate with this film is that combat is a lot of things. It is not just one thing. It is very exciting for everybody. It is very scary for everybody. It is incredibly meaningful. It is very, very sad if you stop and think about what you are doing." Whereas Restrepo showed the "high" of combat, Korengal has been said to express more bitterness.

== Synopsis ==
Text displayed at the start of the film reads: "In April 2010, the U.S. military pulled out of the Korengal Valley, Afghanistan. 42 Americans died fighting there." Archival news footage is then shown of the demolition of Outpost (OP) Restrepo by American troops before their withdrawal from the valley.

The rest of the film takes place in 2007 and 2008, when the men of Second Platoon, Battle Company, were stationed in the Korengal Valley and both constructed and spent much of their time defending OP Restrepo, named after their fallen comrade PFC Juan Sebastián Restrepo. Footage of the men in combat is intermixed with interviews conducted with them afterward, in which most of them express that they had experienced both the most intense fear and the most intense exhilaration of their lives in combat, with stretches of extreme boredom between the spurts of action. All of the soldiers describe bonds with those who served beside them that go beyond the intensity of even their family ties, and one soldier says he would gladly throw himself on a grenade to save the other members of his unit. Many of the soldiers miss the camaraderie of the other men, the adrenaline of war, and the excitement of "cheating death." One soldier says he would "go back right now if I could", while another worries that God hates him for the "sins" he committed on his deployment.

== Reception ==
On review aggregator website Rotten Tomatoes, the film has an approval rating of 87% based on 38 reviews, with an average score of 6.4/10; the website's "critics consensus" reads: "Korengal finds documentarian Sebastian Junger taking another clear-eyed -- and poignantly thought-provoking -- look at the human cost of modern warfare." On Metacritic, it has a weighted average score of 67 out of 100, based on 20 critics, indicating "generally favorable" reviews.

In his review of the film, Justin Chang of Variety wrote that "Sebastian Junger delivers a worthy companion piece to Restrepo with this more reflective dispatch from the front lines of Afghanistan." David Denby of The New Yorker said: "As a record of the war, the two films [Restrepo and Korengal] are imperishable."

A few critics found Korengal meandering. Ed Gonzalez of Slant Magazine, for example, called the film "an alternately gripping and dully meandering patchwork of these soldiers' simultaneously chill and quite literally maddening stay in the Korengal that pointedly shuns big-picture philosophizing."
