= Operation Rock Avalanche =

2007 US-led offensive in Afghanistan

- Part of the War in Afghanistan (2001–2021)
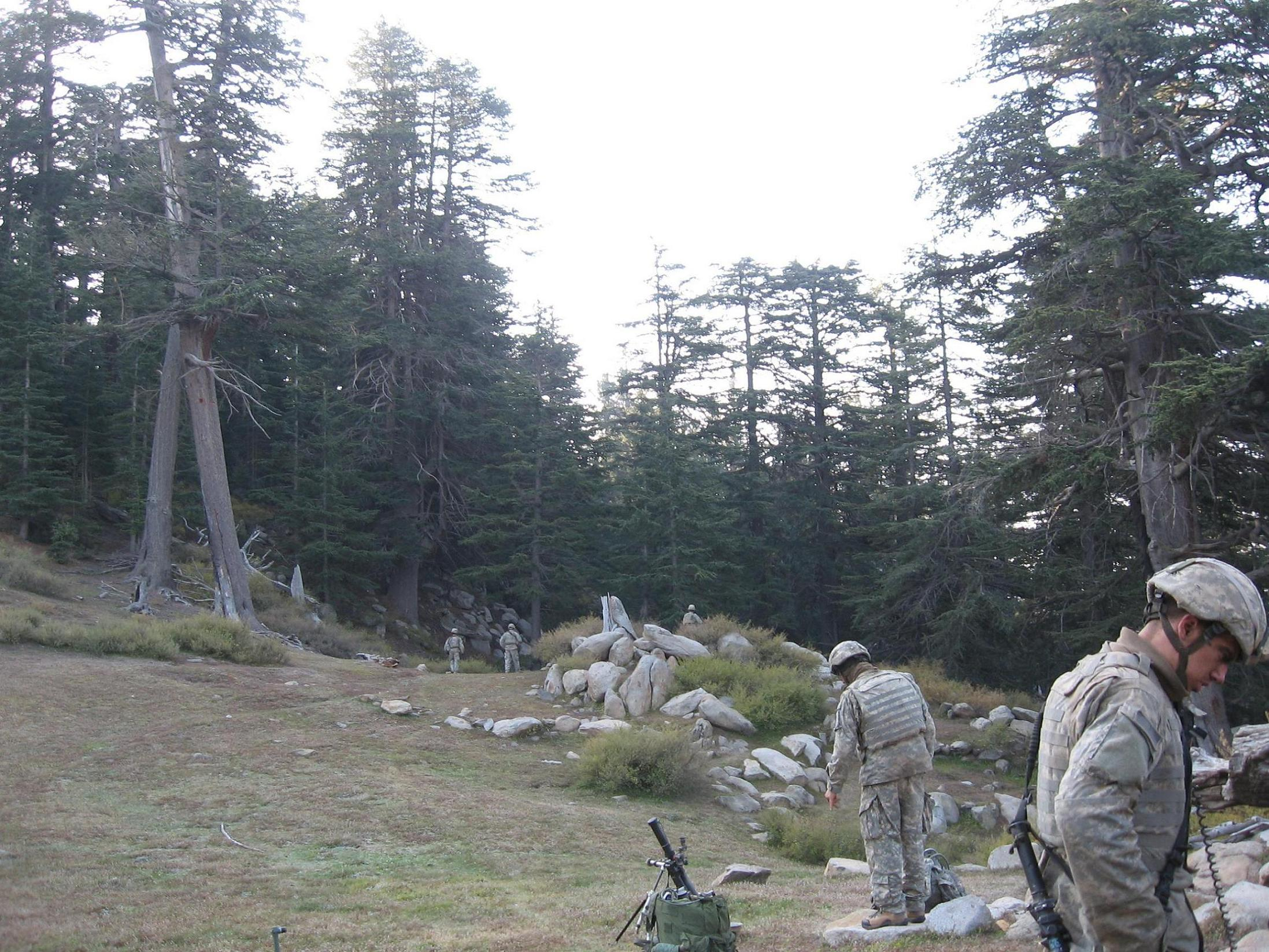
- U.S. soldiers during Operation Rock Avalanche.
Date	19–25 October 2007
Location	Korengal Valley, Kunar, Afghanistan
Result	U.S. victory

Belligerents
United States; Afghanistan	Taliban

Commanders and leaders
(United States) LTC William Ostlund (United States) CPT Daniel Kearney	(Taliban) Haji Matin (Taliban) Aminullah (Taliban) Mohammad Tali †

Strength
(United States) 100+ (Islamic Republic of Afghanistan) 40+	150–300 (U.S. estimate)

Casualties and losses
3 killed At least 7 wounded	40–50 killed (U.S. estimate)
- At least 10 Afghan civilians

Operation Rock Avalanche was a six-day, US-led offensive from 19 to 25 October 2007, with the purpose of hunting Taliban fighters in the Korengal Valley of Afghanistan. The mission also aimed to establish a peace with the local populace so that a road could be safely built through the area by the Afghan government. Over the course of the operation, a series of running battles occurred with members of the Taliban, as well as with local tribesmen. U.S. Army Paratrooper Salvatore Giunta would be awarded the Medal of Honor for his actions during combat between U.S. forces and local Afghans.

== Background ==
The U.S. had struggled for some time to establish itself as a force within the valley. Long considered to be a Taliban stronghold, the Korengal Valley was nicknamed the "Valley of Death" by U.S. forces due to the dangers associated with being stationed there, with sometimes as many as a dozen firefights per day. Spearheaded by Captain Louis Frketic of A Company and Captain Dan Kearney of B Company, 2nd Battalion, 503rd Infantry Regiment (Airborne) of the 173rd Airborne Brigade Combat Team in the Korengal Valley, the goal of the assault was to both disrupt Taliban and insurgent routes of transit in the area, as well as trying to establish a peace with local village elders by offering to build them a new highway through the mountains – paid for by the Afghan government – in exchange for information about anti-governmental combatants.

== The Operation ==
Operation Rock Avalanche began in the early-morning hours of 19 October 2007 when U.S. and Afghan forces boarded UH-60 and CH-47 helicopters at the Korengal Outpost (KOP) to be inserted in the southern portion of the Korengal Valley, near the village of Yaka Chine. This main force consisted mostly of B Company, 2-503rd Infantry, but also included support elements, such as U.S. Air Force Joint Terminal Attack Controllers (JTAC), and a Low-Level Voice Intercept (LLVI) team from the 513th Military Intelligence Brigade. Elements from A, C, and D companies, 2-503 Infantry, also occupied blocking positions around the valley in an effort to prevent Taliban forces from leaving the area. There were several skirmishes early in the operation, ultimately leading to AC-130 and AH-64 gunships firing into the village, resulting in civilian casualties.

The night of the 21st, U.S. forces moved east to conduct operations near the villages of Landigal and Aliabad. Mid-day on the 23rd, Taliban forces attacked and overran a U.S. machine gun position, killing Staff Sergeant Rougle and wounding Sergeant Rice and SPC Vandenberge, before being forced to withdraw. Taliban forces were also able to capture several weapons and equipment from the fallen Americans. U.S. and Afghan forces continued to patrol the area and meet with village elders, resulting in several more firefights and large amounts of U.S. air and artillery support being employed. This attack was witnessed by New York Times journalist Elizabeth Rubin and photojournalist Lynsey Addario, who were embedded with B company at the time.

As the sun set on the 25th, U.S. and Afghan forces began concluding the operation. During their egress, Taliban forces initiated an L-shaped ambush against 1st and 3rd Platoon, B Company. U.S. forces were able to break out of the kill zone and launch a successful counter-attack, but only after two Americans were killed and five more wounded. Taliban leader Muhammad Tali was killed by U.S. Army's SPC Giunta, who was awarded the Medal of Honor for his actions during the engagement.

== Outcome ==
While Taliban forces were able to launch bold attacks against U.S. forces, they were unable to maintain their momentum. Coalition forces inflicted heavy casualties upon the Taliban, including several local leaders. Coalition forces also were able to locate several stone bunkers on the Abas Ghar, as well as firing positions used in attacks against the Korengal Outpost. Taliban activity in the Korengal Valley dropped significantly in the months following the operation.

In April 2010, U.S. forces withdrew from the Korengal Valley. 50 Americans had died fighting there, with over a hundred more wounded.

== Popular culture ==
The events of the offensive were witnessed firsthand by American journalist Sebastian Junger and British photojournalist Tim Hetherington, and were captured on film for their Academy Award-nominated documentary Restrepo. Among other awards, the film received the Grand Jury Prize for best documentary at the 2010 Sundance Film Festival. Junger would later go on to write the book War, an account which expanded upon his experiences during Operation Rock Avalanche.

== See also ==
- Battle of Wanat Battle also involving 2-503 Infantry, 173rd ABCT.
- Operation Red Wings Navy SEAL raid near Korengal Valley, resulting in the deaths of 19 Americans, and LT Michael Murphy receiving the Medal of Honor.
- Death of Linda Norgrove, Scottish aid worker held by Taliban forces in the Korengal Valley.
- Salvatore Giunta, Medal of Honor
- Korengal Valley
- Firebase Phoenix A satellite installation of the Korengal Outpost, along with FB Vegas, OP Restrepo, and OP Dallas.
- Restrepo Documentary about B Company's deployment to the Korengal Valley, including Operation Rock Avalanche.
- Sebastian Junger
