= Juan Sebastián Restrepo =

Colombian-American soldier (1986-2007)

PFC Juan Sebastián Restrepo
- Born: October 7, 1986; Neiva, Huila, Colombia
- Died: July 22, 2007 (aged 20); Korengal Valley, Afghanistan
- Military career
- Branch: United States Army
- Service years: 2006–2007
- Rank: Private first class
- Wars: War in Afghanistan
- Awards: Bronze Star Medal

Juan Sebastián Restrepo (October 7, 1986 – July 22, 2007) was a Colombian-American soldier and medic. Restrepo was killed in the Korengal Valley in Afghanistan, of neck wounds suffered when insurgents attacked his unit using small-arms fire. He was honored in Restrepo, nominated for Best Documentary Feature at the 83rd Academy Awards.

== Early life and family ==
Restrepo was born in Neiva, Huila, Colombia. His mother, Marcela Pardo, a physical therapist, named him after the composer Johann Sebastian Bach. He rarely saw his father Gerardo Restrepo Ramirez, a pediatric neurologist, after his parents separated when he was 2. He had an older brother named Ivan, and a younger brother, Pablo.

In 1993, Pardo and her sons immigrated to the United States, first living in Miami Gardens, Florida. Two years later they moved to Pembroke Pines. Juan was very active in sports, boxing, playing soccer and skateboarding. He attended Charles W. Flanagan High School, graduating in 2004. He planned to be a doctor, like his father and grandfather.

Unable to afford to go to college, Restrepo returned to Colombia, where he studied classical violin at the Luis A. Calvo Academy, District University of Bogotá. After his girlfriend became pregnant with his child, he returned to the United States and enlisted in the military. He returned to Colombia for the birth of his daughter, Ariana.

== Military service ==
In February 2006, Restrepo attended basic training at Fort Sill (Bravo Battery 1st Battalion 79th Field Artillery Regiment). In May 2006, he attended advanced individual training at Fort Sam Houston (Bravo/Charlie Company, 232nd Medical Battalion) before attending airborne school at Fort Benning. He went to Italy and Germany, where he did specialized medical training, before being deployed to the Korengal Valley in May 2007. He was assigned to the 2nd Battalion, 503rd Infantry Regiment (Airborne), 173rd Airborne Brigade Combat Team.

A few months after he arrived, Restrepo's patrol was ambushed in the village of Aliabad. He lifted his head to see if anyone was injured, and took two bullets to the face and neck. He stayed semi-conscious, trying to instruct his fellow soldiers what to do for him. He was stable when he boarded the medevac helicopter, but died of wounds before arriving at the hospital.

He was buried in Colombia.

== Restrepo ==
His life and death, and the lives of his fellow soldiers as they carry on at OP Restrepo, are chronicled in the award-winning documentary Restrepo, by Sebastian Junger and Tim Hetherington, and its sequel, Korengal. The first documentary begins on a train in Italy with an enthusiastic Restrepo excited to go to Afghanistan; he dies shortly after the documentary begins.

Restrepo's death hit his fellow soldiers hard. He was highly respected "because he was brave under fire and absolutely committed to the men. If you got sick he'd take your guard shift. If you were depressed he'd come to your hooch and play guitar. He took care of his men in every possible way," Junger wrote.

Two months after his death, his platoon built a new combat outpost near where he had died and named it OP Restrepo. OP Restrepo housed anywhere from 15 to 20 soldiers at a time during its two years of existence. It had no running water or electricity, but was essentially a shantytown constructed from tarp and plywood, and protected by giant bags of rocks.

"When the boys built that base, the Taliban or the AAF forces in the valley, they were completely in shock. It was like a middle finger sticking out. And they realized once they could not knock off OP Restrepo, we had the upper hand. They started becoming afraid," Capt. Dan Kearney says in Restrepo.

== Honors ==
On October 21, 2016, the city of Pembroke Pines honored him by renaming a portion of Northwest 129th Avenue, between Pines Boulevard and Taft Street, as Pfc. Juan Sebastian Restrepo Avenue. A public ceremony was held at the Pembroke Pines Aquatic Center and included a presentation of colors by the United States Army Color Guard.

== Awards ==
Restrepo was awarded the Bronze Star Medal, Purple Heart, National Defense Service Medal, Afghanistan Campaign Medal, Global War on Terrorism Service Medal, Army Service Ribbon, Overseas Service Ribbon, Basic Parachutist Badge and the Combat Medical Badge.
