= Salvatore Giunta =

United States Army Medal of Honor recipient (born 1985)

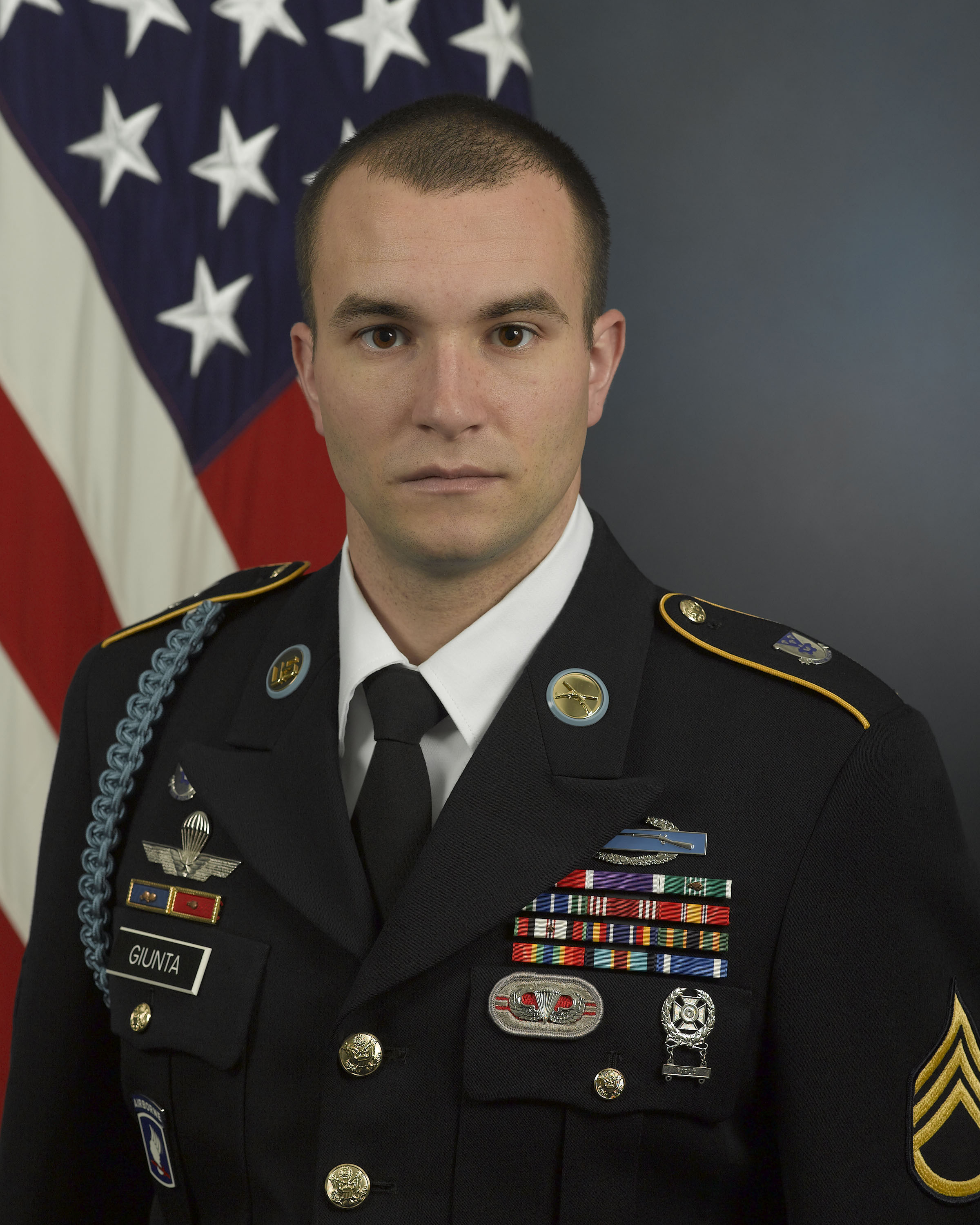
- Giunta in April 2010
- Born: January 21, 1985 (age 41); Clinton, Iowa, U.S.
- Relatives: 1 daughter (born October 6, 2011)
- Military career
- Allegiance: United States
- Branch: United States Army
- Service years: 2003–2011
- Rank: Staff Sergeant
- Units: 2nd Battalion, 503rd Infantry Regiment, 173rd Airborne Brigade
- Conflicts: War in Afghanistan
- Awards: Medal of Honor; Bronze Star Medal; Purple Heart

Salvatore Augustine Giunta (/ˌsælvəˈtɔːreɪ ˈdʒʊntə/; born January 21, 1985) is a former United States Army soldier and the first living person since the Vietnam War to receive the United States Armed Forces' highest decoration for valor, the Medal of Honor. Giunta was cited for saving the lives of members of his squad on October 25, 2007, during the War in Afghanistan. He left the United States Army in June 2011.

== Early life and education ==
Giunta was born in Clinton, Iowa, on January 21, 1985, to an Italian American family. Giunta grew up in Cedar Rapids and Hiawatha. His parents, Steven, a medical equipment technician, and Rosemary, a preschool teacher, live in Hiawatha. He has two younger siblings, Mario and Katie. Giunta attended John F. Kennedy High School in Cedar Rapids. At age 17, while working in a Subway, he decided to enlist and joined the United States Army in November 2003. He was the first in his immediate family to serve in the armed forces since his grandparents emigrated from Italy.

== Military career ==
Giunta attended basic training and infantry school at Fort Benning, Georgia. He was deployed to Afghanistan from March 2005 until March 2006 and again from May 2007 until July 2008. He was promoted to staff sergeant in August 2009. Giunta was last stationed at Caserma Ederle, the 173rd Airborne Brigade Combat Team's base near Vicenza, Italy. He served in the 2nd Battalion, 503rd Infantry Regiment, 173rd Airborne Brigade Combat Team, and worked in a support role for members of his unit then deployed in Afghanistan.

In 2007, Giunta was stationed at Firebase Vegas in the Korengal Valley—an area about 9.7 by 1.6 kilometers (6.03 mi × 0.99 mi) near the Afghanistan–Pakistan border—which the soldiers had nicknamed the Valley of Death. In late October, his company launched a six-day mission known as Operation Rock Avalanche. On October 23, Taliban fighters killed Staff Sergeant Larry Rougle and wounded two other infantrymen when Rougle's position on "Honcho Hill" was overrun. On October 25, company commander Captain Dan Kearney sent 2nd and 3rd Platoon back to meet with the local village elders and to recover from them the U.S. equipment that the Taliban had captured when Rougle was killed. 1st Platoon was tasked with providing protective cover and interdicting enemy forces from a nearby ridge.

=== Medal of Honor action ===
Shortly after nightfall on October 25, 2007, rifle team leader Giunta and the rest of the seven troops of 1st Platoon had just finished a day-long overwatch of 2nd and 3rd Platoon in the valley below. Although dark, there was sufficient moonlight that night vision equipment was not needed. They were returning to Combat Outpost Vimoto and Korengal Outpost. They walked about 10 to 15 feet (3.0–4.6 m) apart through the thin holly forest, along the Gatigal Spur of Honcho Hill at about 2,438 meters (7,999 ft) elevation.

Within 50 to 100 meters (160–330 ft) of leaving their position, 10 to 15 insurgents ambushed the main body of the squad from cover and concealment only about 10 meters (33 ft) away, so near that the Apaches overhead could not provide close air support. The ambushing force was armed with AK-47 assault rifles, 10 rocket-propelled grenade (RPG) launchers, and 4 belt-fed PKM machine guns. They fired an unusually high proportion of tracer rounds. Giunta described it later:

There were more bullets in the air than stars in the sky. A wall of bullets at every one at the same time with one crack and then a million other cracks afterwards. They're above you, in front of you, behind you, below you. They're hitting in the dirt early. They're going over your head. Just all over the place. They were close—as close as I've ever seen.

Ambush on October 25, 2007

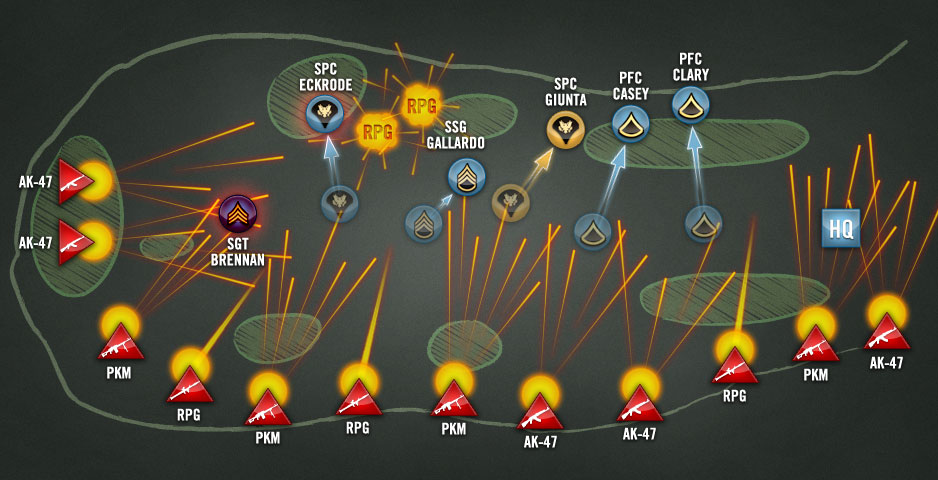
The ambush was initiated with intense RPG and PKM fire

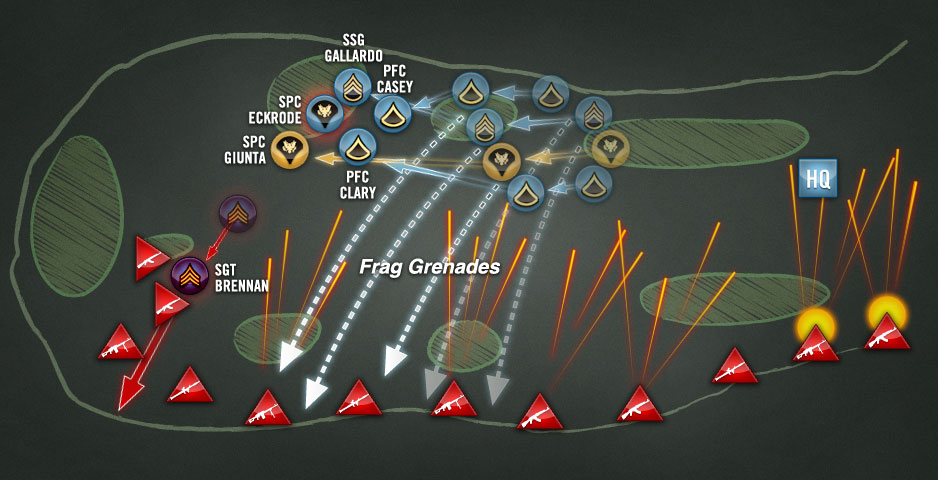
Giunta's squad used grenades to suppress enemy fire

Sergeant Joshua Brennan, leader of Alpha Team and one of Giunta's best friends, was walking point. He was followed by SPC Frank Eckrode, squad leader Erick Gallardo, and then Giunta, who was then a specialist. PFC Kaleb Casey and Garrett Clary followed Giunta. A 13-man Headquarters (HQ) unit led by Lt. Brad Winn, including a five-man gun team from weapons squad, along with a nurse who volunteered for the mission, followed immediately behind them. When the Taliban opened fire, Brennan was struck by eight rounds and Eckrode was hit by four rounds. Gallardo attempted to sprint forward, but RPGs exploding among the thin trees and 18 inches (46 cm)-high bushes around him along with machine gun and small arms fire stopped him. Unable to advance, he fell back to join Giunta's Bravo Team. While backpedaling and firing at the same time, he fell and was in the same moment struck in the helmet by an AK-47 round. The round penetrated his helmet but only grazed his scalp. An RPG round struck very near Giunta, who was returning fire and directing Bravo Team from a small defilade. Giunta was puzzled that the lip of the small depression he lay in was not protecting him from rounds cracking by his head, that they appeared to be coming from the north as well as the west.

Giunta saw Gallardo take the bullet to his head and fall. Assuming Gallardo had been shot, Giunta rose and ran through the intense wall of fire to his side. As he helped the uninjured sergeant find cover, the ceramic plate in the front of Giunta's protective vest was struck by a bullet. Another round struck the SMAW-D weapon slung over his back. Giunta recognized that the extremely heavy tracer fire was coming not just from his west but from the north as well, a classic L-shaped ambush that threatened to flank the squad. He recalled from basic training that to survive an ambush like this he had only one choice: advance on the enemy. He ordered Casey and Clary to pull back a few steps to prevent the Taliban from flanking them. Casey was firing his M249 Squad Automatic Weapon cyclic and Clary was firing his M203 grenade launcher as well.

The platoon leader in the HQ unit, Lieutenant Brad Winn, radioed Captain Kearney to advise him that their unit had five wounded men. The squad's medic, Specialist Hugo Mendoza, was among them. He had been shot through the femoral artery at the beginning of the ambush and died. Kearney ordered Second Platoon to assist Winn's platoon, but Second Platoon was in the valley below, some distance away, and had to first cross a river to reach them.

Giunta and Gallardo gathered Casey and Clary. They were pinned down by the concentrated small arms and cyclic machine gun fire from a number of Taliban positions at close range. Less than 15 seconds into the ambush, Giunta and the others disrupted the attack by throwing volleys of fragmentation grenades towards the Taliban about 15 meters (49 ft) to their west and attacked north. Firing PFC Casey's M249, Clary's M203, and their other weapons, they advanced until they reached Eckrode. Shot twice in one leg and with two other wounds, Eckrode was attempting to unjam his M249 SAW. Gallardo, who later received a Silver Star for his actions, dressed Eckrode's wounds and called for medevac.

Giunta, seeing that Eckrode was tended to, advanced with PFC Clary through the intense enemy gunfire, looking for Brennan. When they could not locate him where they expected to find him, Giunta ran further forward through the effective small arms fire and over the exposed, open crest of the ridge. Giunta saw three individuals and then recognized that two of them were Afghans dragging Sgt. Brennan, one by the legs and one by his arms. Giunta pursued them, firing his M4 carbine as he ran, killing one (later identified as Mohammad Tali, considered a high-value target) and wounding the other. The second Afghan dropped Brennan and fled. An AC-130 gunship shortly afterward spotted someone carrying Brennan's rucksack and killed him. Giunta said, "I ran through fire to see what was going on with [Brennan] and maybe we could hide behind the same rock and shoot together ... He was still conscious. He was breathing. He was asking for morphine. I said, 'You'll get out and tell your hero stories,' and he was like, 'I will, I will.'"

After reaching Brennan, Giunta pulled him back towards the rest of the squad and cover, comforted him, and examined him for wounds in the dark. Brennan was grievously hurt. The 2nd and 3rd Platoons arrived to reinforce 1st Platoon and render aid. Giunta continued to assist the medic and adjust security while they waited for evacuation.

The ambush had lasted three minutes. Later the next day, Brennan died while in surgery. Gallardo told Giunta later on, "You don't understand ... but what you did was pretty crazy. We were outnumbered. You stopped the fight. You stopped them from taking a soldier." Eckrode said of Giunta, "For all intents and purposes, with the amount of fire that was going on in the conflict at the time, he shouldn't be alive."

=== Medal of Honor award ===
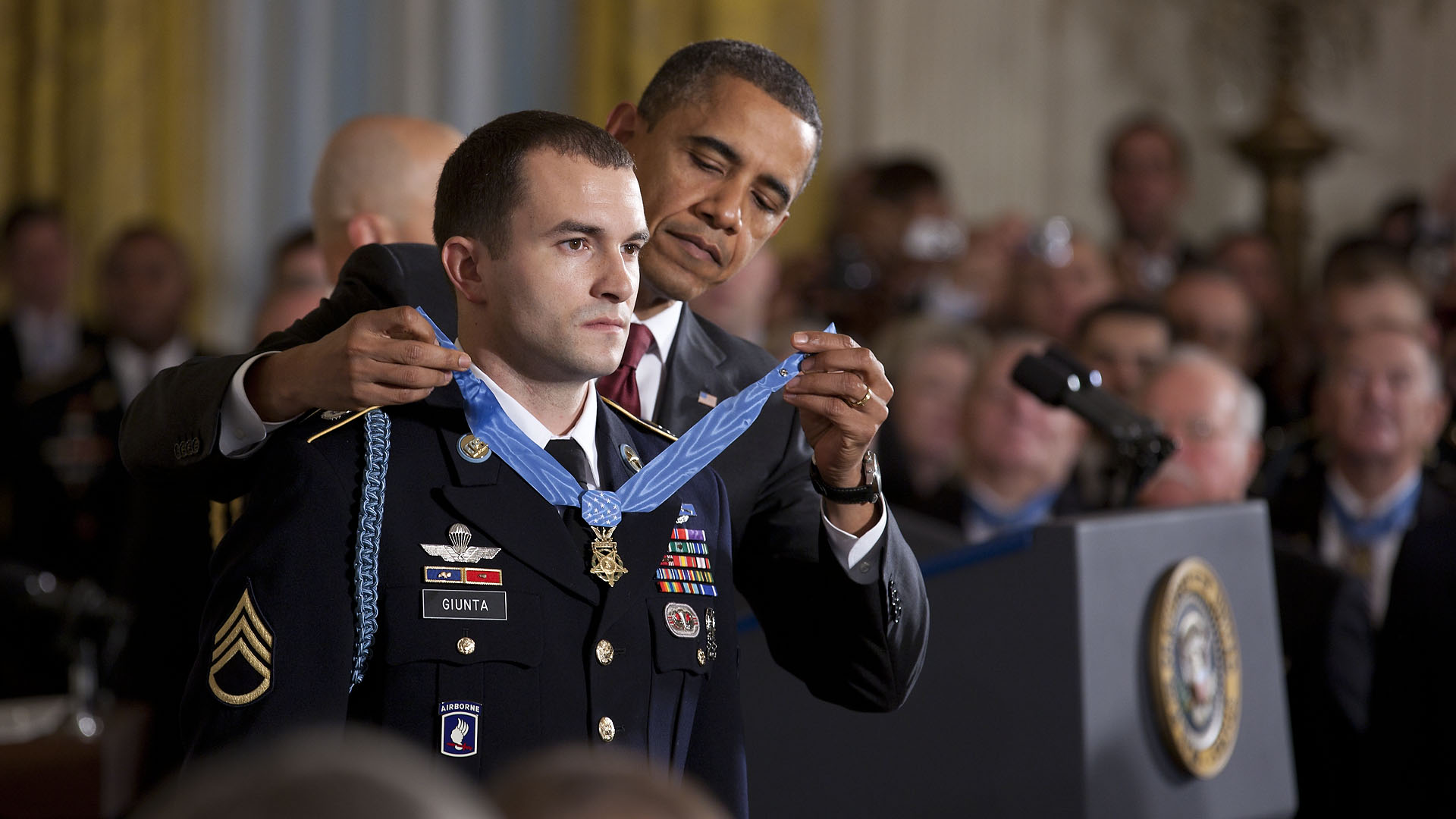
Giunta receiving the Medal of Honor from President Barack Obama on November 16, 2010

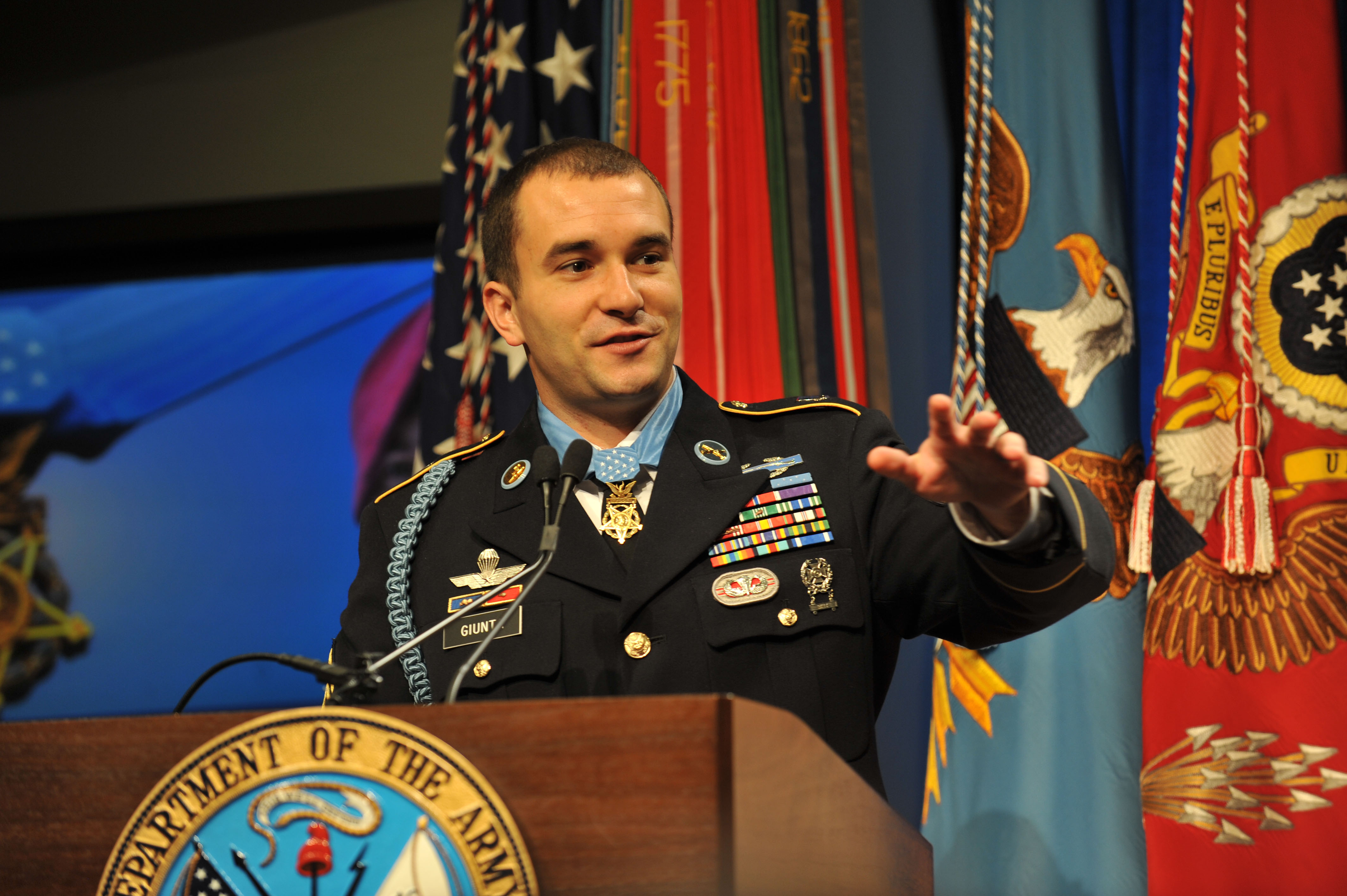
Giunta addresses the audience during the Medal of Honor Hall of Heroes Induction Ceremony at the Pentagon.

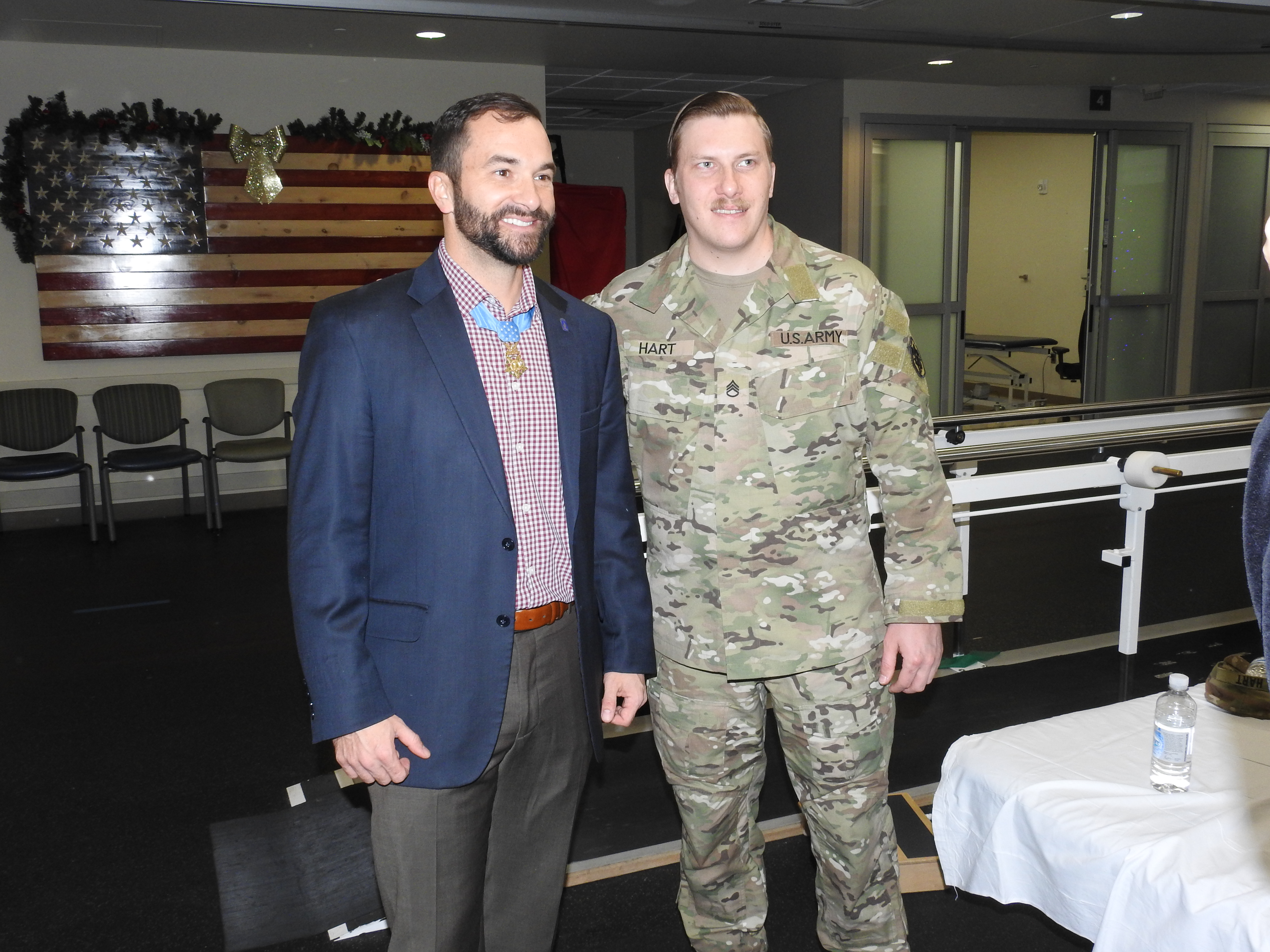
Giunta visits Walter Reed Medical Center, 2024

Giunta learned two days later from Kearney that the latter was going to recommend him for the Medal of Honor. He was uncomfortable about being singled out and labeled a hero. "If I'm a hero, every man that stands around me, every woman in the military, everyone who goes into the unknown is a hero," he says. "So if you think that's a hero—as long as you include everyone with me." Giunta insists that his actions were those of any man in his unit. "In this job, I am only mediocre. I'm average." "I did what I did because in the scheme of painting the picture of that ambush, that was just my brush stroke. That's not above and beyond. I didn't take the biggest brush stroke, and it wasn't the most important brush stroke. Wearing the Medal of Honor is like a slap in the face."

On September 10, 2010, the White House announced that Giunta would be awarded the United States' highest military decoration, the first awarded to a living recipient since the Vietnam War. He received the medal from President Barack Obama during a ceremony at the White House on November 16, 2010. All of his surviving squad members also attended the ceremony.

On July 5, 2017, during a dedication ceremony for the Medal of Honor Walkway, located outside of the 173rd Airborne Brigade Headquarters building in Vicenza, Italy, Salvatore Giunta chose to give his Medal of Honor to the brigade. He stated "I want this to stay here in Vicenza, Italy with the 173rd to the men and women that earn this every single day through their selflessness and sacrifice."

Addressing the attention he has received due to the medal, he stated:

I'm not at peace with that at all," Giunta said. "And coming and talking about it and people wanting to shake my hand because of it, it hurts me, because it's not what I want. And to be with so many people doing so much stuff and then to be singled out—and put forward. I mean, everyone did something.

Giunta is the fourth Medal of Honor recipient from the War in Afghanistan, after U.S. Navy Lieutenant Michael P. Murphy, U.S. Army Sergeant First Class Jared C. Monti, and U.S. Army Staff Sergeant Robert James Miller, the others being posthumously awarded the medal. All four were decorated for actions in eastern Afghanistan's small but highly-lethal Kunar Province.

== Personal life ==
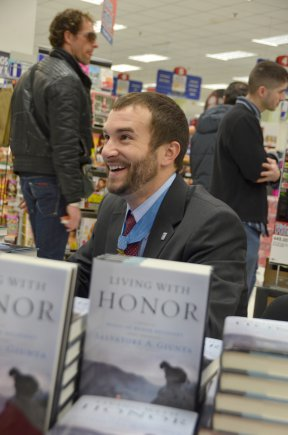
Salvatore Giunta at a book signing at a post exchange in Vicenza, Italy in 2013

Giunta chose not to re-enlist and left the army in June 2011. Giunta and his wife moved to Colorado where he studied at Colorado State University. Giunta has also written an autobiography titled Living with Honor, published by Simon & Schuster.

On December 31, 2010, Giunta was invited by New York City mayor Michael Bloomberg to attend the New Year's Eve celebrations in Times Square. There, he pressed a button upon the start of a sixty-second countdown to initiate the ball drop.

On February 6, 2011, Giunta was honored on the field and via international television broadcast at the beginning of the second half of Super Bowl XLV, which the Green Bay Packers eventually won over the Pittsburgh Steelers.

As of June 2014, Giunta lives in Fort Collins, Colorado.

== Awards and decorations ==
Giunta's military decorations include:

=== Medals and ribbons ===

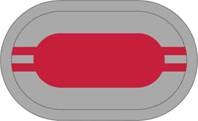

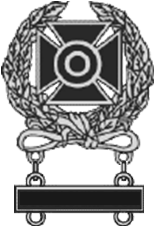

Right breast	Left breast		
Italian Military Parachutist Badge; Army Presidential Unit Citation w/ 2 OLC; Army Meritorious Unit Commendation w/ OLC	Combat Infantryman Badge		
Italian Military Parachutist Badge; Army Presidential Unit Citation w/ 2 OLC; Army Meritorious Unit Commendation w/ OLC	Medal of Honor	Bronze Star	Purple Heart
Italian Military Parachutist Badge; Army Presidential Unit Citation w/ 2 OLC; Army Meritorious Unit Commendation w/ OLC	Meritorious Service Medal	Army Commendation Medal w/ two oak leaf cluster	Army Achievement Medal
Italian Military Parachutist Badge; Army Presidential Unit Citation w/ 2 OLC; Army Meritorious Unit Commendation w/ OLC	Army Good Conduct Medal (2nd award)	National Defense Service Medal	Afghanistan Campaign Medal w/ 2 campaign stars
Italian Military Parachutist Badge; Army Presidential Unit Citation w/ 2 OLC; Army Meritorious Unit Commendation w/ OLC	Global War on Terrorism Expeditionary Medal	Global War on Terrorism Service Medal	Army NCO Professional Development Ribbon
Italian Military Parachutist Badge; Army Presidential Unit Citation w/ 2 OLC; Army Meritorious Unit Commendation w/ OLC	Army Service Ribbon	Army Overseas Service Ribbon	NATO Medal for Service in ex-Yugoslavia
Italian Military Parachutist Badge; Army Presidential Unit Citation w/ 2 OLC; Army Meritorious Unit Commendation w/ OLC	Basic Parachutist Insignia		Expert marksmanship badge for rifle

United Kingdom Parachutist Badge
German Parachutist Badge in bronze
4 Overseas Service Bars
2 Service stripes

=== Medal of Honor citation ===

The President of the United States of America, authorized by an Act of Congress, 3 March 1863, has awarded, in the name of Congress, the Medal of Honor to

SPECIALIST SALVATORE AUGUSTINE GIUNTA
UNITED STATES ARMY

For conspicuous gallantry and intrepidity at the risk of his life above and beyond the call of duty: Specialist Salvatore A. Giunta distinguished himself conspicuously by gallantry and intrepidity at the risk of his life above and beyond the call of duty in action with an armed enemy in the Korengal Valley, Afghanistan, on October 25, 2007. While conducting a patrol as team leader with Company B, 2d Battalion (Airborne), 503d Infantry Regiment, Specialist Giunta and his team were navigating through harsh terrain when they were ambushed by a well-armed and well-coordinated insurgent force. While under heavy enemy fire, Specialist Giunta immediately sprinted towards cover and engaged the enemy. Seeing that his squad leader had fallen and believing that he had been injured, Specialist Giunta exposed himself to withering enemy fire and raced towards his squad leader, helped him to cover, and administered medical aid. While administering first aid, enemy fire struck Specialist Giunta's body armor and his secondary weapon. Without regard to the ongoing fire, Specialist Giunta engaged the enemy before prepping and throwing grenades, using the explosions for cover in order to conceal his position. Attempting to reach additional wounded fellow soldiers who were separated from the squad, Specialist Giunta and his team encountered a barrage of enemy fire that forced them to the ground. The team continued forward and upon reaching the wounded soldiers, Specialist Giunta realized that another soldier was still separated from the element. Specialist Giunta then advanced forward on his own initiative. As he crested the top of a hill, he observed two insurgents carrying away an American soldier. He immediately engaged the enemy, killing one and wounding the other. Upon reaching the wounded soldier, he began to provide medical aid, as his squad caught up and provided security. Specialist Giunta's unwavering courage, selflessness, and decisive leadership while under extreme enemy fire were integral to his platoon's ability to defeat an enemy ambush and recover a fellow American soldier from the enemy. Specialist Salvatore A. Giunta's extraordinary heroism and selflessness above and beyond the call of duty are in keeping with the highest traditions of military service and reflect great credit upon himself, Company B, 2d Battalion (Airborne), 503d Infantry Regiment, and the United States Army.

BARACK OBAMA
/s/ Barack Obama
PRESIDENT OF THE UNITED STATES OF AMERICA

== His publications ==
- Giunta, Sal; Layden, Joe (2012). Living with Honor: A Memoir. Threshold Editions. ISBN 978-1451691467.

== See also ==
- List of post-Vietnam War Medal of Honor recipients
