= Firebase Phoenix =

American Military Firebase

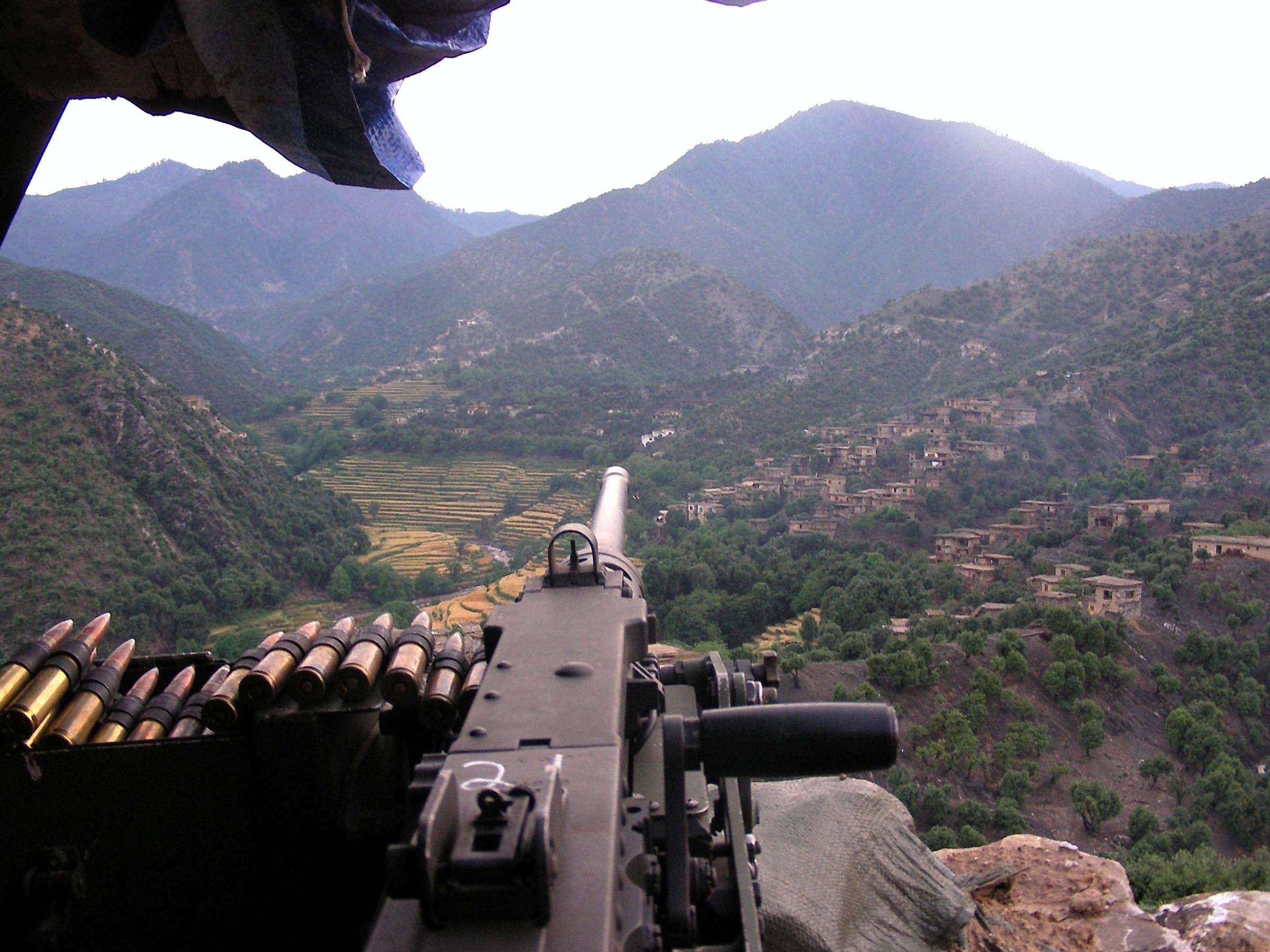
The view from a gun position at Firebase Phoenix overlooking the Korengal valley

Firebase Phoenix was a small American firebase in the Korengal valley in Kunar Province, Afghanistan. The valley is 20 km from the Pakistani border, northwest of the Khyber Pass and northeast of Tora Bora.

One of the purposes of the Firebase was to guard and help facilitate those rebuilding the Pech River Road. The American Forces Press Service quoted Sergeant first class Jose Magaña:

I hope they know by now why they are here. To look out outside the base and see people doing things, selling things, kids going to schools, even girls, that’s why we’re here, so that the Afghan people can do things many take for granted. It’s not easy to bear all the sacrifices these soldiers are making, but their role is historic in granting people the same freedoms we have at home.

Our job is to secure an area of the Pesh River road. The strategic location and purpose of this road make it very valuable. We need to ensure the road’s progress moves forward. This road will improve the lives of the people who live here, enhance the Afghan security forces' ability to control the area and stimulate economic and social development.
