= Kyle White (US soldier) =

United States Army Medal of Honor recipient

Kyle J. White
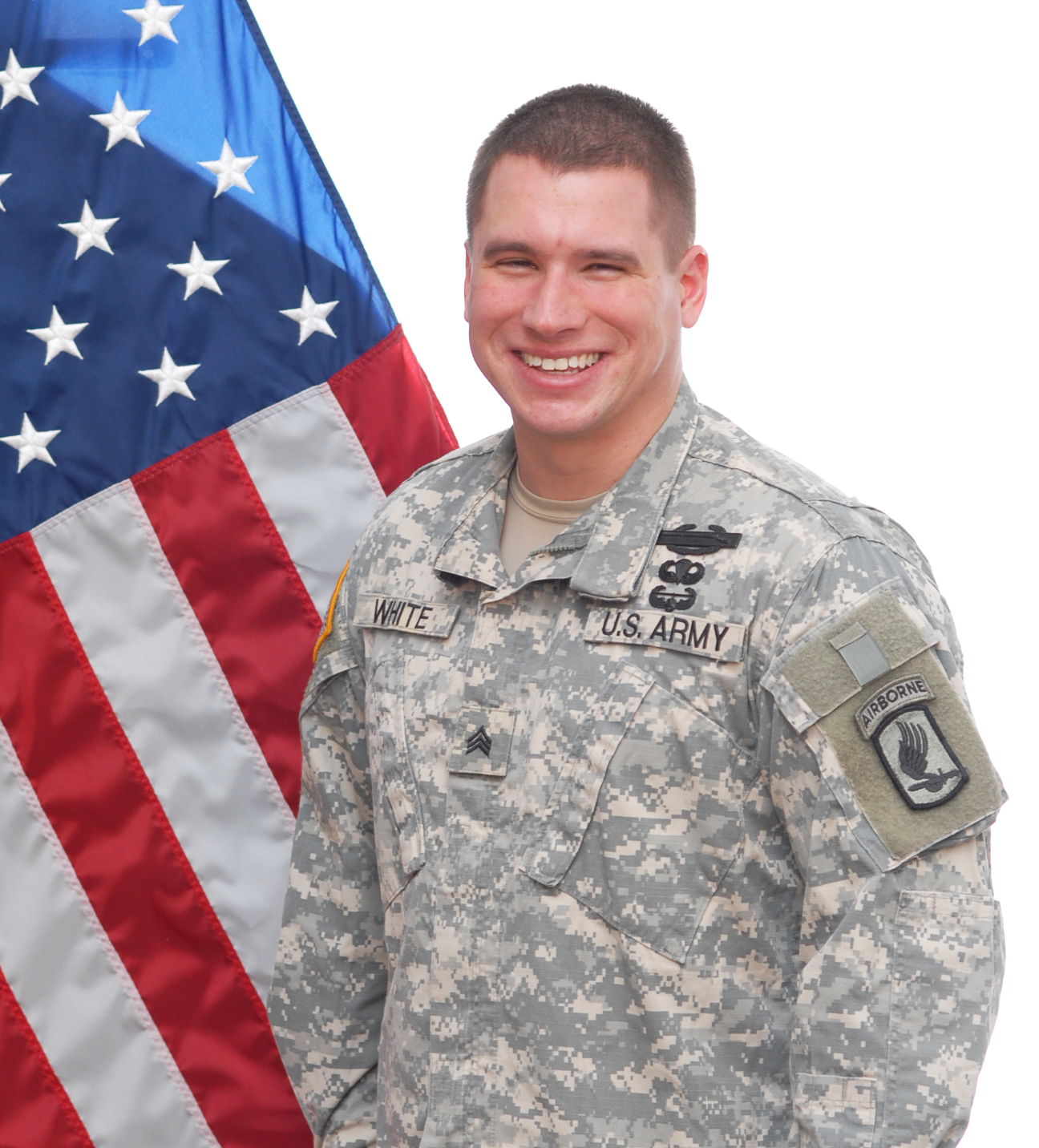
- SGT Kyle J. White in March 2014
- Born: March 27, 1987 (age 39); Seattle, Washington
- Military career
- Allegiance: United States
- Branch: United States Army
- Service years: 2006–2011
- Rank: Sergeant
- Units: 2nd Battalion, 503rd Infantry Regiment, 173rd Airborne Brigade Combat Team
- Conflicts: War in Afghanistan
- Awards: Medal of Honor; Purple Heart

Kyle Jerome White (born March 27, 1987) is an American financial analyst and former United States Army soldier. He is the seventh living recipient of the Medal of Honor from the War in Afghanistan.

== Early life ==
White was born on March 27, 1987, and lived in Bonney Lake, Washington. He enlisted in the United States Army on February 15, 2006, attending basic training, advanced individual training, as well the United States Army Airborne School consecutively, at Fort Benning. White's military education includes the Combat Life Saver Course, United States Army Air Assault School, Infantryman Course (One-Station Unit Training), Primary Leadership Development Course and Reconnaissance and Surveillance Leaders Course.

== Military service ==
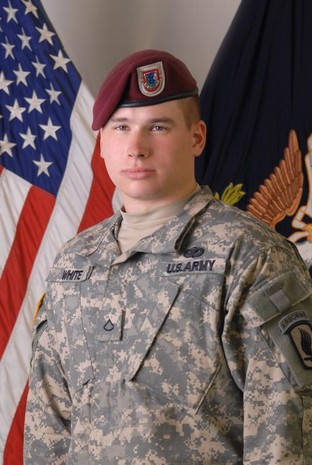
White in mid-2007, before his deployment to Afghanistan

White was assigned to the 2nd Battalion, 503rd Infantry Regiment from 2006 to 2008. In early 2007, as part of Operation Enduring Freedom, he was deployed to Aranas, Afghanistan where he served as a platoon radio telephone operator. White's actions on November 9, 2007, were the basis for his receiving the Medal of Honor.

From 2008 to 2010, White was assigned to the 4th Ranger Training Battalion at Fort Benning. In May 2011 he departed the active-duty United States Army.

=== Medal of Honor ===
Prior to the event that lead to the awarding of the Medal of Honor, White noticed that during a Shura "it seemed like every male fighting-age and above was there in attendance." Half an hour later he and his unit were under attack. During the Battle of Aranas on November 9, 2007, White suffered a mild traumatic brain injury from a rocket-propelled grenade blast and from the subsequent blast of a 120 mm mortar round fired by United States forces. Although injured himself, White provided assistance to the soldiers and marines around him while under heavy fire. He was later diagnosed with post-traumatic stress disorder, but says he copes with its symptoms by exercising. Through 2014, White's face still had bullet fragments from an AK-47 round that shattered on a rock in front of him.

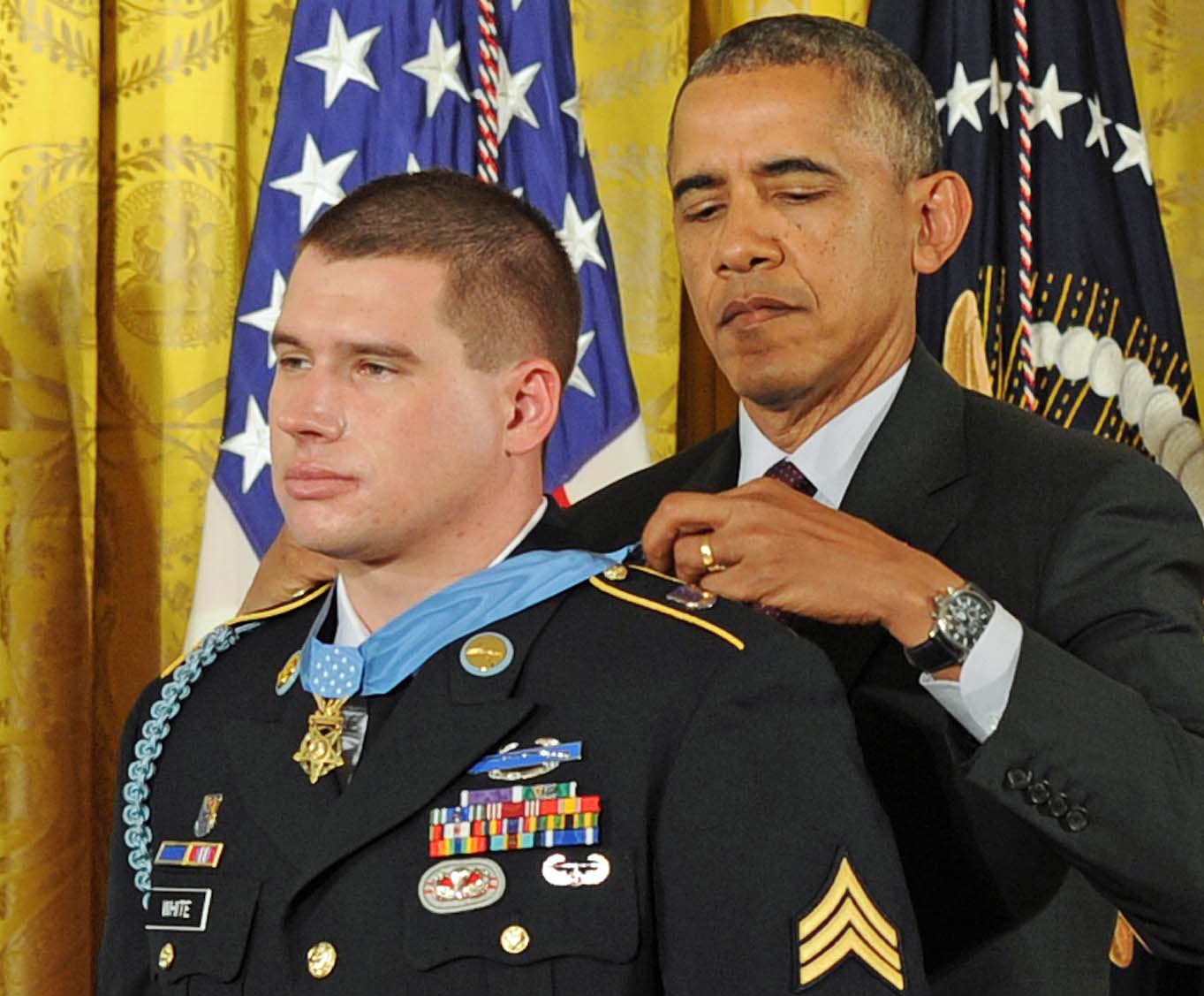
White receiving the Medal of Honor from President Barack Obama on May 13, 2014, for his actions in Afghanistan on November 9, 2007

After the battle, paperwork regarding a potential Medal of Honor awarding was delayed in the Pentagon. On May 14, 2014, White received the Medal of Honor in a White House ceremony, for administering life-saving medical aid to comrades and for radioing situational reports; that battle resulted in five soldiers (1st Lt. Matthew C. Ferrara, Sgt. Jeffery S. Mersman, Spc. Sean K. A. Langevin, Spc. Lester G. Roque, and Pfc. Joseph M. Lancour) and marine Sgt. Phillip A. Bocks being killed and all eight surviving Americans being wounded. White became the seventh living recipient of the Medal of Honor from either the Iraq War or Afghanistan operations. The following day, White was inducted into the Pentagon's Hall of Heroes by Deputy Defense Secretary Robert O. Work.

=== Citation ===

The President of the United States of America, authorized by Act of Congress, March 3, 1863, has awarded in the name of Congress the Medal of Honor to Specialist Kyle J. White, United States Army.

Specialist Kyle J. White distinguished himself by acts of gallantry and intrepidity at the risk of his life above and beyond the call of duty while serving as a radio telephone operator with Company C, 2d Battalion (Airborne), 503d Infantry Regiment, 173d Airborne Brigade, during combat operations against an armed enemy in Nuristan Province, Afghanistan on 9 November 2007. On that day, Specialist White and his comrades were returning to Bella Outpost from a shura with Aranas Village elders. As the soldiers traversed a narrow path surrounded by mountainous, rocky terrain, they were ambushed by enemy forces from elevated positions. Pinned against a steep mountain face, Specialist White and his fellow soldiers were completely exposed to enemy fire. Specialist White returned fire and was briefly knocked unconscious when a rocket-propelled grenade impacted near him. When he regained consciousness, another round impacted near him, embedding small pieces of shrapnel in his face. Shaking off his wounds, Specialist White noticed one of his comrades lying wounded nearby. Without hesitation, Specialist White exposed himself to enemy fire in order to reach the soldier and provide medical aid. After applying a tourniquet, Specialist White moved to an injured Marine, similarly providing aid and comfort until the Marine succumbed to his wounds. Specialist White then returned to the soldier and discovered that he had been wounded again. Applying his own belt as an additional tourniquet, Specialist White was able to stem the flow of blood and save the soldier's life. Noticing that his and the other soldier's radios were inoperative, Specialist White exposed himself to enemy fire yet again in order to secure a radio from a deceased comrade. He then provided information and updates to friendly forces, allowing precision airstrikes to stifle the enemy's attack and ultimately permitting medical evacuation aircraft to rescue him, his fellow soldiers, Marines and Afghan Army soldiers. Specialist Kyle J. White's extraordinary heroism and selflessness above and beyond the call of duty are in keeping with the highest traditions of military service and reflect great credit upon himself, Company C, 2d Battalion (Airborne), 503d Infantry Regiment, 173d Airborne Brigade and the United States Army.

== Post-military career ==
In 2013, White received a Bachelor of Science degree in Business Administration from the University of North Carolina at Charlotte, where he majored in finance. He became an investment analyst with the Royal Bank of Canada. In 2013, he joined Bank of America Merrill Lynch as a fixed income bond trader.

== Awards and decorations ==
White has earned the following awards and decorations:

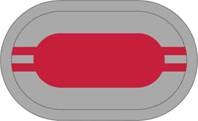

Right breast		Left breast		
Army Presidential Unit Citation	Valorous Unit Award	Combat Infantryman Badge		
Army Presidential Unit Citation	Valorous Unit Award	Medal of Honor		
Army Presidential Unit Citation	Valorous Unit Award	Purple Heart	Army Commendation Medal w/ Valor Device one bronze Oak Leaf Clusters	Army Achievement Medal w/ one Oak leaf cluster
Army Presidential Unit Citation	Valorous Unit Award	Army Good Conduct Medal	National Defense Service Medal	Afghanistan Campaign Medal w/ 1 service stars
Army Presidential Unit Citation	Valorous Unit Award	Global War on Terrorism Expeditionary Medal	Global War on Terrorism Service Medal	NCO Professional Development Ribbon
Army Presidential Unit Citation	Valorous Unit Award	Army Service Ribbon	Army Overseas Service Ribbon with award numeral 2	NATO Medal for ex-Yugoslavia
Army Presidential Unit Citation	Valorous Unit Award	Parachutist Badge with 2nd Battalion, 503rd Infantry Regiment trimming		Air Assault Badge

White has earned two Overseas Service Bars and one service stripe.

== See also ==
- List of post-Vietnam Medal of Honor recipients
