= Korangal Valley =

Valley in Kunar Province, Afghanistan

Coordinates: 34.89°N 70.91°E

Korangal Valley (Pashto (Note: Pashto pronunciation: [ko.ɻəŋˌɡəl]): کړنگل), alternatively spelled as Korengal, Kurangal, Korangal, nicknamed "The Valley of Death", is a valley in the Dara-I-Pech District of Kunar Province, eastern Afghanistan.

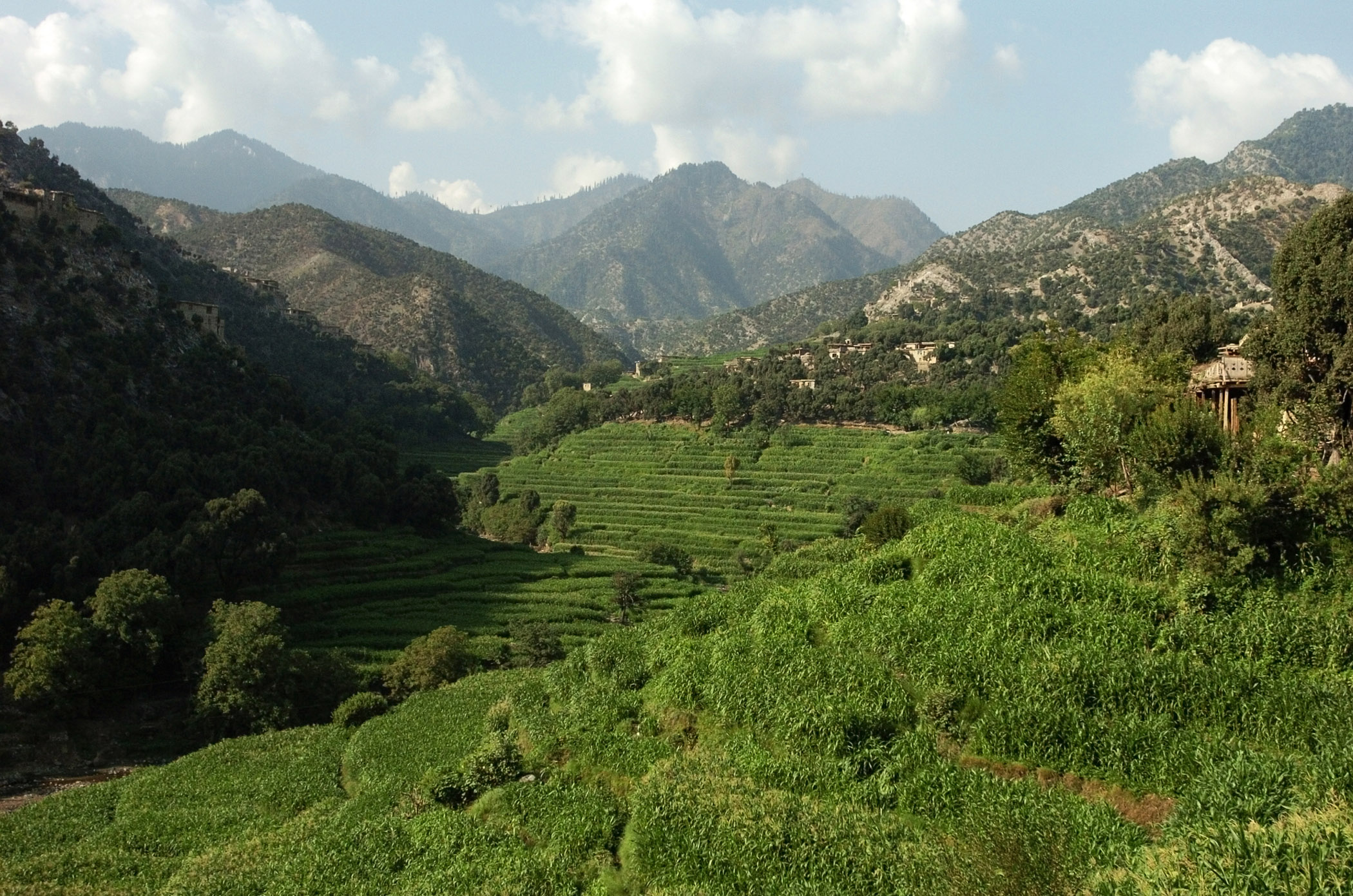
Korangal Valley in 2009

== Agriculture and forestry ==
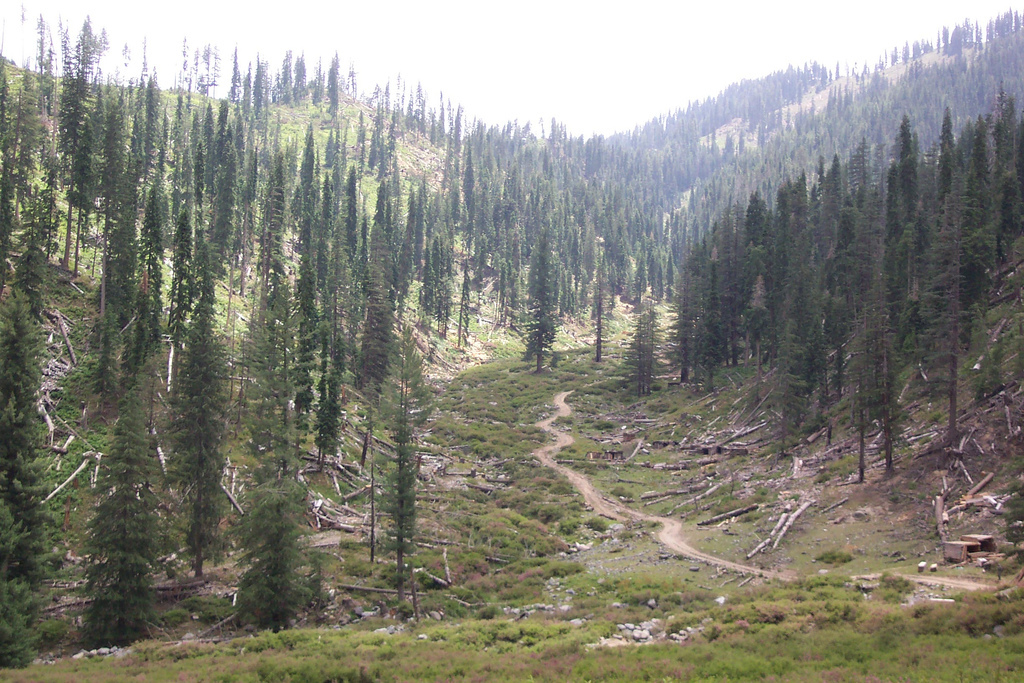
Illegal tree chopping by timber mafia in the Korengal Valley (2003)

The valley is formed by a right tributary of the Pech River. It is about 10 kilometers (6.2 mi) long and 10 kilometers wide. The valley has rocky mountains with limited agricultural land. The Korangal Valley is lushly forested with pine trees. Much of the valley's income is due to legal and illegal forestry and timber sales. In 2006, U.S. military and the government of Afghanistan reclaimed the Lumber Yard and established the first government presence in the valley since the 1980s. The Afghan government is working to find ways to boost the economy of the region so that illegal timbering can come to an end.

== Population ==
The Korangal Valley is home to around 10,000 people known as Korangalis. They live in scattered villages along the valley, relying mainly on logging for survival. These logs are sold to logging companies in Asadabad, the provincial capital, from where they are usually transported to Pakistan. The ethnic origins of the Korangalis are uncertain, with some anthropologists suggesting they may be related to the Nuristanis or Pashayi. Pashayi people who reside in the Korangal Valley speak the Korangal dialect of the Pashayi language. The name of the valley, however, comes from the Southern Nuristani languages (such as Waigali, Ashkun, Tregami or Zemiaki) Korangalis also speak their own dialect. Historically, the Korangalis inhabited the fertile lands near the Pech River, but were displaced by migrating Safis. This displacement led to a longstanding feud between the two groups, although the Safis never attempted to invade the valley itself. During the Soviet–Afghan War, the Soviet Army tried to enter the valley, but were defeated by the locals.

== Villages ==
The valley includes more than a dozen villages:

Ali Abad, Kunar (Elabat)	Darbart, Korengal Valley, Kunar Province, Afghanistan. Ali Abad & Marasta Naw, Korengal Valley, Kunar Province, Afghanistan.
Ashat, Kunar	
Bebiyal, Kunar	Bibiyal, Korengal Valley, Kunar Province, Afghanistan. Bibiyal, Korengal Valley, Kunar Province, Afghanistan. Bibiyal, Korengal Valley, Kunar Province, Afghanistan.
Darbat, Kunar	
Donga, Kunar	
Landigal, Kunar	Laniyal from Ali Abad, Korengal Valley, Kunar Province, Afghanistan.
Landigal, Kunar	Landigal village, Kunar Province, Afghanistan.
Hendarok lower, Kunar	
Hendarok upper, Kunar	Hidarook (oboo Naw), Kunar, Afghanistan.
Kandalik, Kunar	
Chechal, Kunar	Chichal, Korengal Valley, Kunar Province, Afghanistan.
Dakalbat, Kunar	
Seipale, Kunar	
Yakha China, Kunar	
Kandalam, Kunar	
Old Korangal, Kunar	Old korengal from Ali Abad, Kunar, Afghanistan.

== War in Afghanistan ==
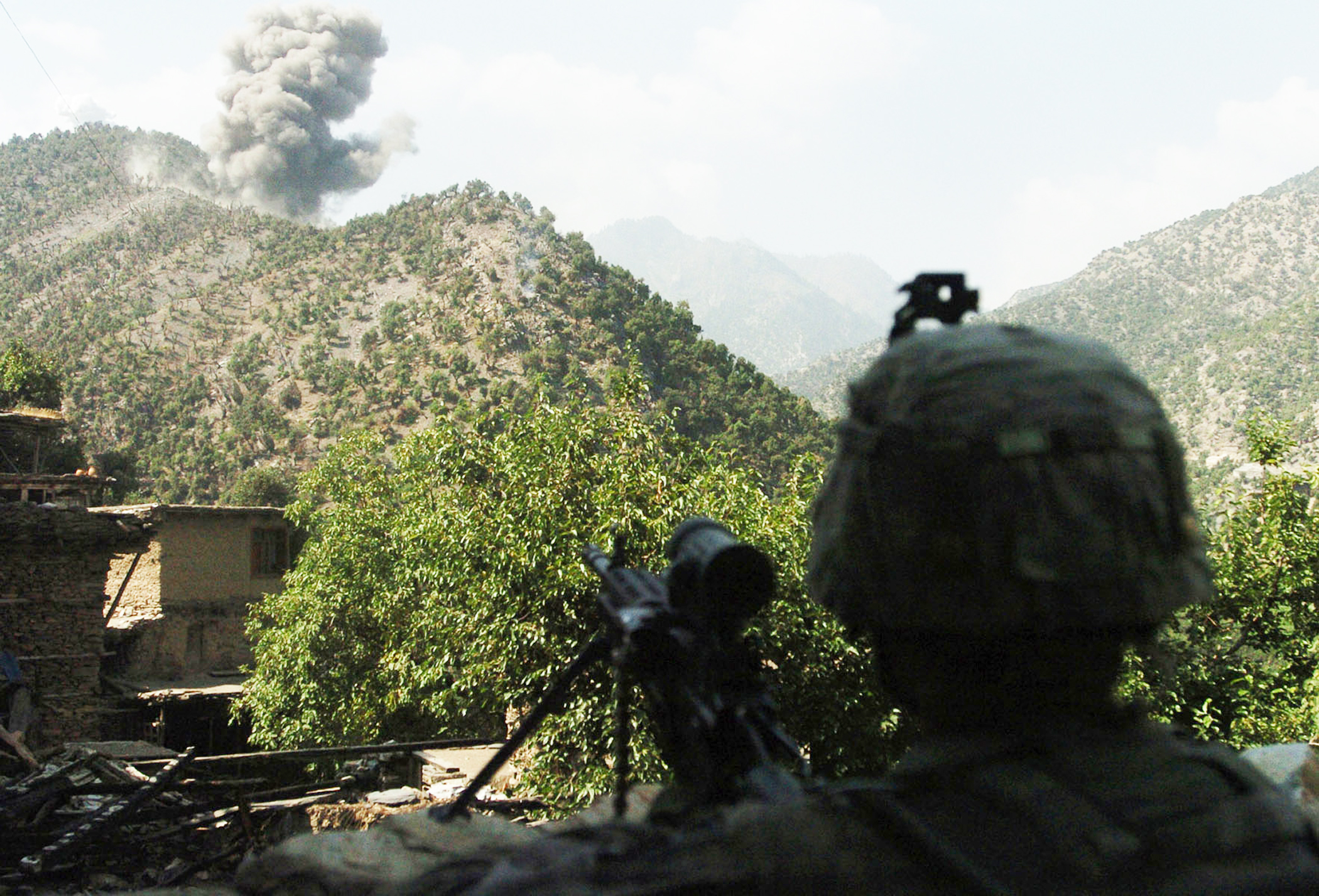
A U.S. Army Soldier assigned to Company B, 2nd Battalion, 12th Infantry Regiment, 4th Brigade Combat Team, 4th Infantry Division watches as Air Force F-15E Strike Eagles bomb insurgent positions after a 20-minute gun battle in the Korengal Valley on August 13, 2009.

U.S. Army Special Forces and Rangers had conducted an unknown number of operations there prior to October 2004 when 3rd Battalion, 6th Marines became the first Marine unit to begin operations there, followed by 3rd Battalion, 3rd Marines the next month. In the fall of 2005, the Marines of 2nd Battalion, 3rd Marines Echo Company conducted a 28-day foot patrol beginning at the backside of the valley, not only making them the farthest occupying force in that area to date but also claiming the longest completed foot patrol since Vietnam. Later Ed Darack wrote the book Victory Point, documenting two operations that the 2nd Battalion, 3rd Marines conducted in the area, including the Korangal Valley, Operation Red Wings, and Operation Whalers.

The Korangal Outpost (KOP) was established at an abandoned lumber yard in April 2006 by Task Force Lava of 1st Battalion, 3rd Marines and subsequently transferred to the U.S. Army's Alpha Company, 1st Battalion, 32nd Infantry, 10th Mountain Division. Firebase Phoenix (later called Firebase Vimoto) was established in the village of Babeyal in the spring of 2007 by 2nd Platoon, A Company, 1st Battalion, 32nd Infantry, 10th Mountain Division to act as a security buffer between the villagers and active anti-coalition militia (ACM) fighters in the valley.

The strongly independent tribes of the Korangal Valley, who have opposed all forms of government other than a council of elders, viewed the U.S. troops as invaders. This created constant tension between the locals and the U.S. military which prevented significant progress against the Taliban. After years of sustained fighting and casualties, the U.S. military closed Korangal Outpost on April 14, 2010; the valley subsequently reverted to Taliban control. Forty-two American servicemen died fighting in the Korangal and hundreds were wounded, primarily between 2006 and 2009. Many Afghan soldiers died there as well. The valley has been dubbed "The Valley of Death" by American forces.

British photographer Tim Hetherington won the 2008 World Press Photo award with a shot he took while reporting on the war in Korangal Valley for Vanity Fair magazine in January 2008. Sebastian Junger's (2010) book War, and the subsequent film Restrepo, document his experiences while embedded with Battle Company, 2nd Battalion, 503rd Infantry, 173rd Airborne Brigade Combat Team that manned the small Outpost Restrepo, named for fallen medic Juan Sebastián Restrepo, in the Korangal Valley. In War, Junger described the valley as "sort of the Afghanistan of Afghanistan: too remote to conquer, too poor to intimidate, too autonomous to buy off". A second film, Korengal, gives a more in-depth view into life at Outpost Restrepo.

By early 2019, the valley was captured by Islamic State - Khorasan Province affiliated groups, after multiple clashes with Taliban groups present in the area. As of later that year, clashes were still ongoing between Taliban-affiliated groups and ISKP fighters in the valley.

== See also ==
- Restrepo, 2010 documentary
- Korengal, 2014 documentary
- Valleys of Afghanistan
- Operation Rock Avalanche

== Bibliography ==
- Darack, Ed (2009). Victory Point: Operations Red Wings and Whalers – The Marine Corps' Battle for Freedom in Afghanistan. Berkley Hardcover. ISBN 978-0-425-22619-3.
