= Tim Hetherington =

British photojournalist

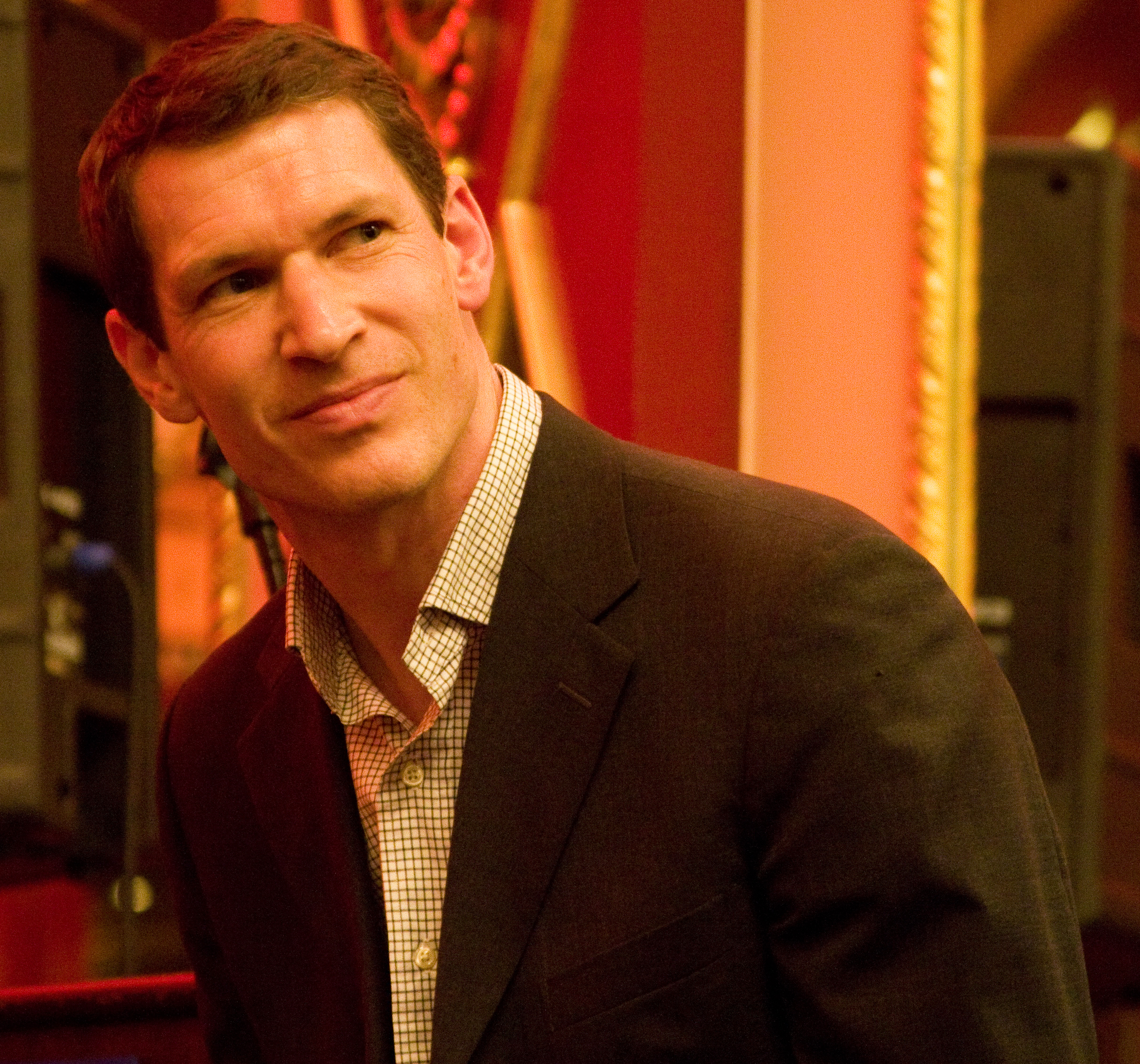
- Hetherington in 2011
- Born: Timothy Alistair Telemachus Hetherington; 5 December 1970; Birkenhead, Cheshire, England
- Died: 20 April 2011 (aged 40); Misrata, Libya
- Cause of death: Ballistic trauma
- Burial place: Brompton Cemetery, London, England
- Citizenship: British
- Education: Lady Margaret Hall, Oxford; Cardiff University
- Occupation: Photojournalist
- Years active: 1996–2011
- Known for: Restrepo (2010)

Timothy Alistair Telemachus Hetherington (5 December 1970 – 20 April 2011) was a British photojournalist. He produced books, films and other work that "ranged from multi-screen installations, to fly-poster exhibitions, to handheld device downloads" and was a regular contributor to Vanity Fair.

He was best known for the documentary film Restrepo (2010), which he co-directed with Sebastian Junger. Restrepo won the Grand Jury Prize for best documentary at Sundance Film Festival 2010 and was nominated for an Academy Award for Best Documentary Feature in 2011. Hetherington won various awards including the 2008 World Press Photo of the Year.

He was killed by shrapnel from either a mortar shell or an RPG fired by Libyan forces while covering the 2011 Libyan civil war.

== Early life and education ==
Born in Birkenhead to Judith (née Gillett) and Alistair Hetherington, Tim Hetherington was raised in Southport, where he attended St Patrick's Catholic Primary School. Later he attended Stonyhurst College and read Classics and English at Lady Margaret Hall, Oxford in 1989.

Shortly after graduation he received £5,000 from his grandmother's will, which enabled him to travel for two years in India, China, and Tibet. That trip made him realise he "wanted to make images", so he "worked for three to four years, going to night school in photography before eventually going back to college." He then studied photojournalism under Daniel Meadows and Colin Jacobson in Cardiff in 1996.

== Career ==
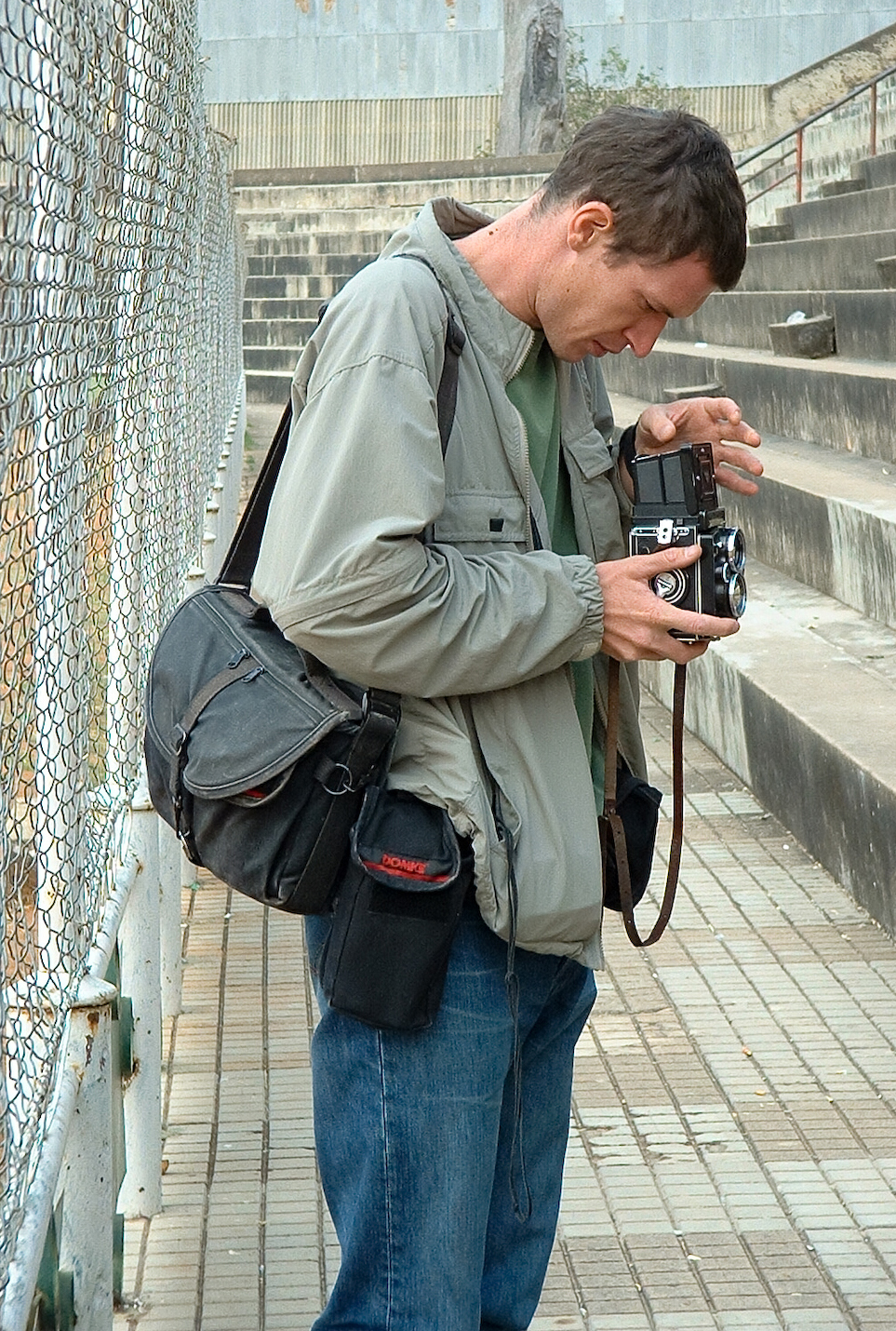
Hetherington at work in Huambo, Angola, 2002

Hetherington's first job was that of a trainee at The Big Issue, in London. He was their sole staff photographer, photographing homeless shelters, demonstrations, dockers' strikes, boxing gyms, celebrities, etc. He was not fond of his celebrity assignments, wanting to focus on what he believed to be more serious stories. He spent much of the next decade in West Africa, documenting political upheaval and its effects on daily life in Liberia, Sierra Leone, Nigeria, and other countries. Hetherington worked as a photographer on the films Liberia: An Uncivil War (2004) and The Devil Came on Horseback (2007). In 2006, Hetherington took a break from image-making to work as an investigator for the United Nations Security Council's Liberia Sanctions Committee.

Hetherington made several trips to Afghanistan in 2007 and 2008 with writer Sebastian Junger, on assignment for Vanity Fair. They were embedded with a single U.S. Army platoon (Second Platoon, B Company, 2nd Battalion, 503rd Infantry Regiment, 173rd Airborne Brigade Combat Team) serving at a remote outpost in the Korengal Valley. They filmed the 2010 documentary film Restrepo there, and Afghanistan – The Other War, which was broadcast on ABC News's Nightline programme. Hetherington's book Infidel is based on the same platoon. He also created a unique video installation called Sleeping Soldiers, first shown at the 2009 New York Photo Festival.

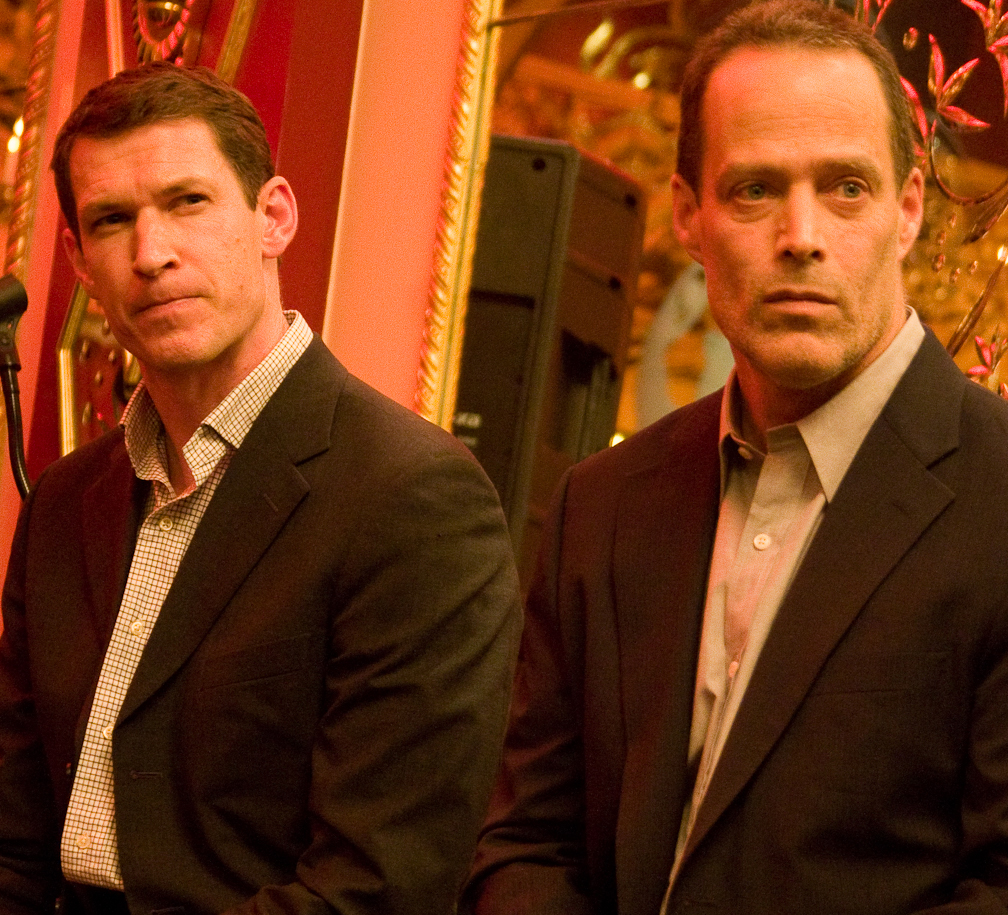
Hetherington (left) with Sebastian Junger in 2011.

In 2010 he directed the short film Diary:

Diary is a highly personal and experimental film that expresses the subjective experience of my work, and was made as an attempt to locate myself after ten years of reporting. It's a kaleidoscope of images that link our western reality to the seemingly distant worlds we see in the media.

== Death ==
In a June 2010 interview for The New York Times, when asked by photojournalist Michael Kamber about Infidel, the book he did with Chris Boot that was about to be published, Hetherington commented on the level of danger he encountered when working on it:

The first time I went to Afghanistan, in 2007, the world was very much focused on Iraq. People had forgotten – and now we have come to accept – that the Afghan war was going out of control. When I got to the Korangal Valley, and there was lots of fighting going on, it completely surprised me. I was gobsmacked. At the end of October 2007, 70 percent of American bombs being dropped were in that valley, and the casualty rate was at 25 percent wounded. So the images I made were very action oriented. Photojournalism. Reminiscent of classical war photography. I did that because I wanted people to see that there was a lot of fighting going on. Anyway, I go back and the fighting sort of bored me. Because when you are in a lot of combat after a while, a lot of it – you know? If you are inside a base that's being attacked, like Restrepo was, you are in a fairly good position. The likelihood of you being killed was pretty low, unless they put a mortar on you.

Hetherington was killed while covering the front lines in the besieged city of Misrata, Libya, during the 2011 Libyan civil war. There appeared to be uncertainty whether he was killed by shrapnel from a mortar shell or an RPG round. One report said "several Libyan rebels" were killed in the blast, and at least two other journalists survived. The same attack killed photographer Chris Hondros, gravely wounded photographer Guy Martin, and wounded photographer Michael Christopher Brown.

A source said that the group was travelling with rebel fighters. Hetherington had tweeted the previous day,

In besieged Libyan city of Misrata. Indiscriminate shelling by Qaddafi forces. No sign of NATO.

Hetherington survived the initial incident and was loaded into a van alive, but died due to excessive blood loss.

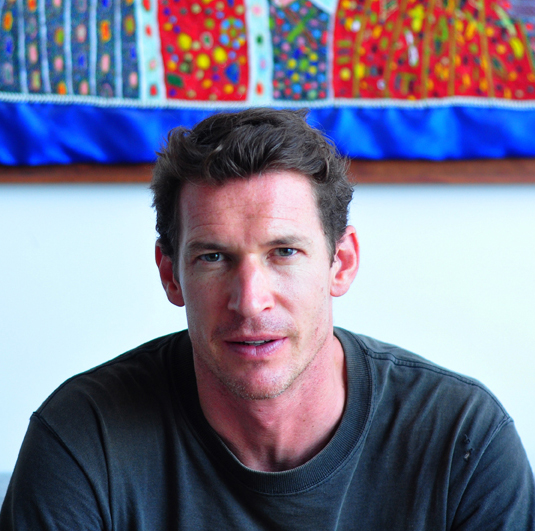
Hetherington in 2010

Hetherington was buried in Brompton Cemetery, London, survived by his partner, parents, sister, brother, and several nieces and nephews.

Just days after his death in Misrata, the Libyan city of Ajdabiya renamed its largest square after him. Anti-Gaddafi protesters also held a march to the newly renamed Tim Hetherington Square in his honour. "We have named the square after this hero and I now consider Tim as one of our martyrs," Al Jazeera quoted a Libyan surgeon in the city as saying.

Senator John McCain sent two American flags to a memorial service in New York: one was given to the Hetherington family; the other was presented to filmmaker Idil Ibrahim, Hetherington's life partner and co-worker at Zeila Films, where he had served as head cinematographer / director of photography. The flags were delivered at the service by four American veterans of Battle Company of the 173rd Airborne in Afghanistan, who had been "many times ... under fire with Tim" and Junger, who wrote the account of the service.

== Personal life ==
Hetherington was in a romantic relationship with Idil Ibrahim before he was killed during the Libyan Civil War.

== Awards ==
- 1999: World Press Photo, 2nd prize, Sports stories.
- 2000-2004: Fellowship from the National Endowment for Science, Technology, and the Arts (NESTA) "to investigate how online technology can reinvent the traditions of documentary photography to ensure it stays relevant to the 21st century".
- 2001: World Press Photo, 1st prize, Portraits stories.
- 2002: Hasselblad Foundation grant.
- 2007: World Press Photo of the Year for a photograph from the Korangal Valley.
- 2007: World Press Photo, 2nd prize, General News stories.
- 2008: Rory Peck Award for Features.
- 2009: Alfred I. duPont Award in Broadcast Journalism.
- 2010: Grand Jury Prize for best documentary for Restrepo (made with Sebastian Junger), Sundance Film Festival.
- 2011: Restrepo was nominated for "Academy Award Best Documentary – Feature" at the 83rd Academy Awards.
- 2011: "Leadership in Entertainment Award" by Iraq and Afghanistan Veterans of America (IAVA), posthumously, for his work on Restrepo.
- 2011: Frontline Club Memorial Tribute Award, posthumously, along with photojournalists Chris Hondros and Anton Hammerl.
- 2013: McCrary Award For Excellence in Journalism from the Congressional Medal of Honor Society of the United States of America, USA.

== Books ==
=== Books by Hetherington ===
- Long Story Bit by Bit: Liberia Retold. New York: Umbrage, 2009. ISBN 1-884167-73-X.
- Infidel. London: Chris Boot, 2010. ISBN 1-905712-18-9. With an introduction by Sebastian Junger.

=== Books with contributions by Hetherington ===
- Tales from a Globalizing World. London: Thames and Hudson, 2003. ISBN 978-0-500-28432-2. Edited by Daniel Schwartz. Hetherington contributes a short essay, "Healing Sport", and photographs with text.
- The World's Top Photographers: Photojournalism. Brighton & Hove: Rotovision, 2006. ISBN 978-2-88893-092-1. Hetherington contributes photographs and captions. Edited by Andy Steele.

=== Books about Hetherington ===
- Here I Am: The Story of Tim Hetherington, War Photographer. New York: Grove, 2013. ISBN 978-0-8021-2090-8. By Alan Huffman.

== Exhibitions ==
- 2009: Home For Good group exhibition, New York Photo Festival, NY. Included Sleeping Soldiers prints and projection by Hetherington as well as work by Simon Roberts, Louie Palu, Adam Nadel, David Gray, Chris Killip, Venetia Dearden, Seba Kurtis, Lorraine Grupe, and Bruno Stevens. Curated by Foto8.
- 2009: Liberia Long Story Bit by Bit: Liberia Retold, Foto8, HOST Gallery, London, September 2009.
- 2010: Infidel, Foto8, HOST Gallery, London, September–October 2010.
- 2010: Liberia Retold and Sleeping Soldiers, Guernsey Photography Festival, May 2010.
- 2012: In Afghanistan, with Lynsey Addario, Nobel Peace Center, Oslo, Norway.
- 2013: Tim Hetherington: You Never See Them Like This, Open Eye Gallery, Liverpool, September–November 2013.
- 2014: Tim Hetherington: Infidel, Photofusion, London, 22 August - 17 September 2014; resuming 1–31 October 2014. A "mixture of photographs and video, drawn from his series Infidel and Diary".
- 2016: Infidel, The John Lennon Art and Design Building, Liverpool John Moores University, Liverpool, UK, September 2016. Photographs and video.

== Filmography ==
=== Films by Hetherington ===
- Sleeping Soldiers, 2009. Short film.
- Diary, 2010. Short film.
- Restrepo (with Sebastian Junger), 2010. Feature-length film.

=== Contributions to films ===
- Liberia: An Uncivil War (2004). Feature-length film. Hetherington contributed cinematography.
- The Devil Came on Horseback (2007). Feature-length film. Hetherington contributed cinematography.
- Korengal (2014). By Sebastian Junger. Sequel to Restrepo. Feature-length film. Hetherington contributed cinematography and photo credits.

== Legacy ==
The Tim Hetherington Grant is awarded annually by World Press Photo and Human Rights Watch to a photographer who has participated in a recent World Press Photo Contest in order to finalise a project on a human rights theme.

Sebastian Junger's documentary film Which Way Is the Front Line from Here? The Life and Time of Tim Hetherington (2013), backed by HBO Films, is a tribute to Hetherington.

Hetherington's estate was represented by Magnum Photos. He was preparing to apply to the photo agency before he died. His estate is now represented by Imperial War Museums.

=== Tim Hetherington Trust ===
The Tim Hetherington Trust was set up in 2012 by Hetherington's parents Judith and Alistair, with Stephen Mayes its executive director. Its website states its mission is "to preserve the legacy of Tim's professional life as a visual storyteller and human rights advocate" including "the support and nurture of new work that continues the ideals demonstrated by Tim with special emphasis on humanitarian and social concerns".

=== Tim Hetherington Photobook Library ===
The Tim Hetherington Photobook Library is a library of roughly 1200 photography books at the Bronx Documentary Center, 614 Courtlandt Avenue, Bronx, New York. It is stocked with donated books—Hetherington's parents donated his collection, whilst Aperture Foundation, Radius Books, Eugene Richards and Peter van Agtmael have also donated.

== See also ==
- List of British film directors
- List of film and television directors
- List of photojournalists
- List of people educated at Stonyhurst College
