= 2nd Battalion, 503rd Infantry Regiment =

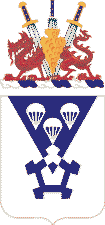
- Coat of arms
- Active: 1941–45; 1951–83; 1986–90; 2001–present
- Country: United States
- Branch: United States Army
- Type: Infantry
- Role: Airborne
- Size: Battalion
- Part of: 173rd Airborne Brigade Combat Team
- Garrison/HQ: Caserma Del Din, Vicenza, Italy
- Nickname: The Rock
- Engagements: World War II; Vietnam War; Operation Enduring Freedom; Operation Iraqi Freedom

Commanders
- Battalion Commander: LTC Will Freakley
- Command Sergeant Major: CSM Brian Briggs

Insignia
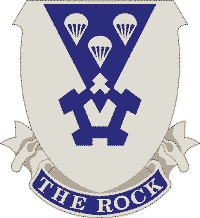
- Distinctive unit insignia

- Beret flash

The 2nd Battalion, 503rd Infantry Regiment (2-503rd IR) is an active duty airborne infantry battalion in the United States Army, assigned to the 173rd Airborne Brigade Combat Team and stationed at Caserma Del Din, Vicenza, Italy. The battalion has served with the 2nd Infantry Division, the 11th Airborne Division, the 24th Infantry Division, the 25th Infantry Division, the 82nd Airborne Division, the 101st Airborne Division, and the 173rd Airborne Brigade; has been stationed in Korea, Germany, Italy and the United States; and earned campaign credits in World War II, the Vietnam War, Operation Enduring Freedom—Afghanistan, and Operation Iraqi Freedom.

== History ==
The lineage of Company B, 503rd AIR was redesignated on 1 September 1957 as Headquarters and Headquarters Company, 2d Airborne Battle Group, 503d Infantry (2-503rd), assigned to the 82nd Airborne Division, and activated at Fort Bragg, North Carolina (organic elements concurrently constituted and activated).

2-503rd was relieved on 24 June 1960 from assignment to the 82nd Airborne Division and assigned to the 25th Infantry Division in Hawaii. The following year, on 1 July 1961, it was relieved from assignment to the 25th Infantry Division and assigned on 26 March 1963 to the 173rd Airborne Brigade on Okinawa.

On 25 June 1963, 2-503rd was reorganized and redesignated as the 2nd Battalion (Airborne), 503rd Infantry.

The 2-503d was assigned to the 101st Airborne Division at Fort Campbell, Kentucky as part of the 3d Bde along with the 1-503d and 3-187th.

From December 1986 to September 1990, the 2-503rd was assigned to Camp Hovey, Korea, along with the 1-503rd, as a Light Infantry battalion. Together, the two battalions comprised the 2nd Brigade of the 2nd Infantry Division. While there the battalion participated in annual rotations for patrol, guardpost, and quick-reaction force duty at the DMZ.

== Lineage and honors ==
=== Lineage ===
- Constituted 14 March 1941 in the Army of the United States as Company B, 503d Parachute Battalion
- Activated 22 August 1941 at Fort Benning, Georgia
- Consolidated 24 February 1942 with Company B, 503d Parachute Infantry (concurrently constituted in the Army of the United States), and consolidated unit designated as Company B, 503d Parachute Infantry
- Inactivated 24 December 1945 at Camp Anza, California
- Redesignated 1 February 1951 as Company B, 503d Airborne Infantry, an element of the 11th Airborne Division, and allotted to the Regular Army
- Inactivated 1 March 1957 in Germany and relieved from assignment to the 11th Airborne Division
- Redesignated 1 September 1957 as Headquarters and Headquarters Company, 2d Airborne Battle Group, 503d Infantry, assigned to the 82d Airborne Division, and activated at Fort Bragg, North Carolina (organic elements concurrently constituted and activated)
- Relieved 24 June 1960 from assignment to the 82d Airborne Division and assigned to the 25th Infantry Division
- Relieved 1 July 1961 from assignment to the 25th Infantry Division
- Assigned 26 March 1963 to the 173d Airborne Brigade
- Reorganized and redesignated 25 June 1963 as the 2d Battalion, 503d Infantry
- Relieved 14 January 1972 from assignment to the 173d Airborne Brigade and assigned to the 101st Airborne Division
- Inactivated 1 October 1983 at Fort Campbell, Kentucky, and relieved from assignment to the 101st Airborne Division
- Assigned 16 December 1986 to the 2d Infantry Division and activated in Korea
- Inactivated 29 September 1990 in Korea and relieved from assignment to the 2d Infantry Division
- Assigned 16 December 2001 to the 173d Airborne Brigade and activated at Caserma Ederle, Vicenza, Italy
- Redesignated 1 October 2005 as the 2d Battalion, 503d Infantry Regiment

(173d Airborne Brigade redesignated 16 September 2006 as the 173d Airborne Brigade Combat Team)

=== Campaign participation credit ===
- World War II: New Guinea; Leyte; Luzon (with arrowhead); Southern Philippines
- Vietnam: Defense; Counteroffensive; Counteroffensive, Phase II (with arrowhead); Counteroffensive, Phase III; Tet Counteroffensive; Counteroffensive, Phase IV; Counteroffensive, Phase V; Counteroffensive, Phase VI; Tet 69/Counteroffensive; Summer-Fall 1969; Winter-Spring 1970; Sanctuary Counteroffensive; Counteroffensive, Phase VII; Consolidation I
- War on Terrorism: Campaigns to be determined
  - Afghanistan: Consolidation I, Consolidation II, Consolidation III, Transition I
  - Iraq: Liberation of Iraq (with arrowhead); Transition of Iraq

Note: The published Army lineage shows War on Terrorism "Campaigns to be determined". Comparison of the battalion's deployment dates with the War on Terrorism campaigns estimates that the battalion will be credited with participation in the six campaigns listed.

=== Decorations ===
- Presidential Unit Citation (Army), Streamer embroidered CORREGIDOR
- Presidential Unit Citation (Army), Streamer embroidered PHUOC VINH
- Presidential Unit Citation (Army), Streamer embroidered DAK TO
- Meritorious Unit Commendation (Army), Streamer embroidered VIETNAM 1965-1967
- Meritorious Unit Commendation (Army), Streamer embroidered IRAQ 2003
- Philippine Presidential Unit Citation, Streamer embroidered 17 OCTOBER 1944 TO 4 JULY 1945
- Republic of Vietnam Cross of Gallantry with Palm, Streamer embroidered VIETNAM 1965–1970
- Republic of Vietnam Civil Action Medal, First Class, Streamer embroidered VIETNAM 1969–1971

== Heraldry ==
=== Distinctive unit insignia ===
503rd Infantry Distinctive Unit Insignia

=== Coat of arms ===
503rd Infantry Coat of Arms
