= Operation Marauder =

Part of the Vietnam War (1966)

- Part of the Vietnam War
Date	1–8 January 1966
Location	Plain of Reeds, Mekong Delta, South Vietnam 10.5°N 105.7°E
Result	Allied operational success

Belligerents
United States; Australia; New Zealand	Viet Cong

Commanders and leaders
(United States) Brig Ellis W. Williamson	

Units involved
(United States) 173rd Airborne Brigade (Australia) 1st Battalion, Royal Australian Regiment; 161 Bty, Royal New Zealand Artillery	267th Main Force Battalion; 506th Battalion

Casualties and losses
(United States) 3 killed	114 killed

Operation Marauder was an operation conducted by the 173rd Airborne Brigade and the 1st Battalion, Royal Australian Regiment (1 RAR) in the Plain of Reeds, Mekong Delta, lasting from 1 to 8 January 1966.

== Prelude ==
The Plain of Reeds had long been used as a base by the Viet Cong (VC). Operation Marauder marked the first time that U.S. forces had operated in the area.

== Operation ==
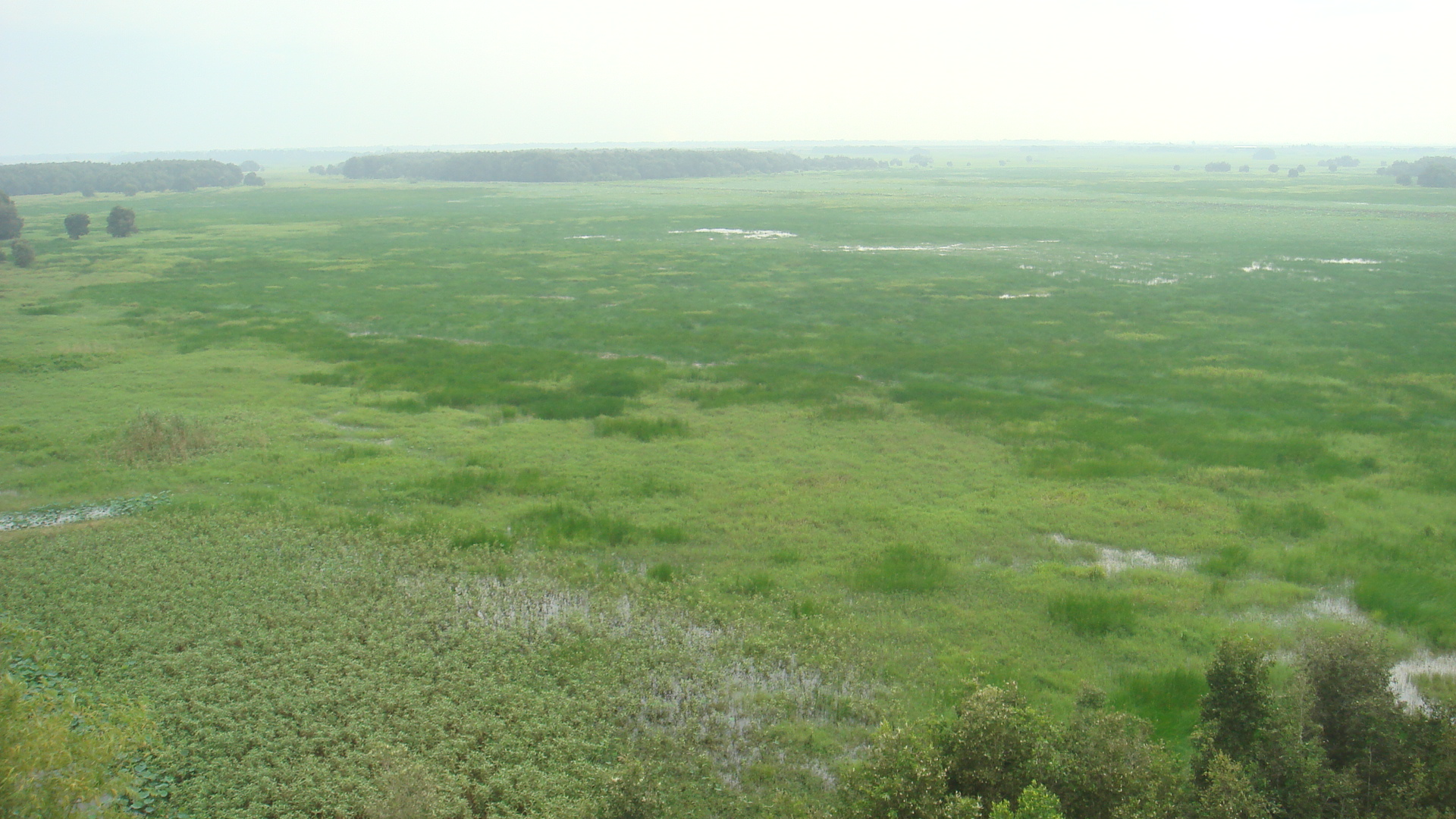
Typical terrain in the Plain of Reeds

On 1 January 1966 1st Battalion, 503rd Infantry Regiment, 2nd Battalion, 503rd Infantry Regiment, 1 RAR and C Battery, 3rd Battalion, 319th Artillery Regiment which included 161 Battery, Royal New Zealand Artillery, were deployed by air into Ba Tri airfield from Hậu Nghĩa Province.

On 2 January 2/503rd landed at Landing Zone Wine (10.822°N 106.404°E) where they were engaged by an entrenched Viet Cong force. After a daylong battle, supported by artillery fire and air support the 2/503rd overran the VC position, finding 111 dead. The remainder of the operation saw only sporadic contact with the VC.

On 3 January 1966, two rounds fired by 161 Bty accidentally landed on C Company, 2/503rd killing three paratroopers and wounding seven. The short rounds were found to have happened due to damp powder.

The Australians from 1 RAR also were engaged in extensive patrolling activity during the January 2–6 period. They made small, sporadic contact with the enemy in their sector, killing two VC. However, they also found an ammunition cache and several large rice caches. On January 5, one patrol made contact with a VC platoon in the vicinity of Hoa Khanh, but the enemy broke contact and fled.

On 6 January the 2/503rd located the abandoned headquarters of the 506th Battalion, recovering arms, ammunition, maps and personnel rosters.

== Aftermath ==
Operation Marauder officially concluded on 8 January with claims of heavy losses having been inflicted on the VC 267th Main Force Battalion and the headquarters of the 506th Battalion.
