= 173rd Airborne Brigade =

Formation of the United States Army

173rd Mobile Brigade Combat Team (Airborne)
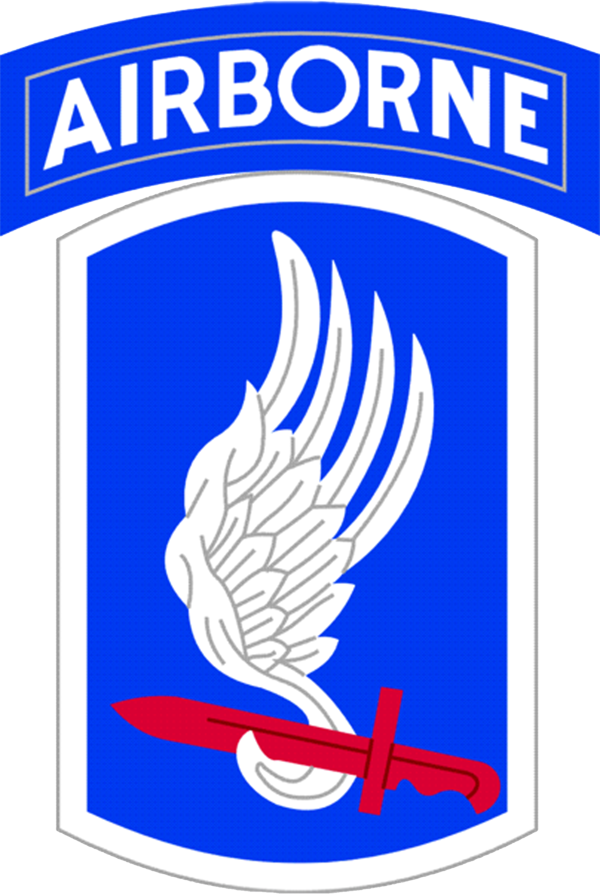
- 173rd Airborne Brigade Shoulder Sleeve Insignia
- Active: 5 August 1917–January 1919 (173rd Infantry Bge.); 24 June 1921–21 September 1945 (various designations); 12 May 1947–1 December 1951 (various designations); 26 March 1963–14 January 1972 (173rd Airborne Bge.); 12 June 2000–15 September 2006 (173rd Airborne Bge.); 15 September 2006-October 2025 (173rd Airborne IBCT); October 2025-present (173rd Airborne MBCT)
- Country: United States
- Branch: United States Army
- Type: Airborne light infantry
- Role: European and African area quick response force
- Size: 3,300
- Part of: Southern European Task Force, Africa
- Garrison/HQ: Caserma Del Din (Vicenza, Italy)
- Nickname: Sky Soldiers (special designation)
- Anniversaries: 26 March 2003 Iraq Invasion
- Engagements: World War I; World War II; Rhineland; Ardennes-Alsace; Central Europe; Vietnam; Defense; Counteroffensive; Counteroffensive, Phase II; Counteroffensive, Phase Ill; Tet Counteroffensive; Counteroffensive, Phase lV; Counteroffensive, Phase V; Counteroffensive, Phase VI; Tet 69/Counteroffensive; Summer- Fall 1969; Winter- Spring 1970; Sanctuary Counteroffensive; Counteroffensive, Phase VII; Consolidation I; Operation Iraqi Freedom; OIF Phase I; Global War on Terrorism; Afghanistan; Operation Enduring Freedom; OEF Phase VIII; OEF Phase X; OEF Phase XIII; Armed Forces Expeditionary Force; Operation Atlantic Resolve
- Decorations: Presidential Unit Citation, 1967; Meritorious Unit Commendation Army, 1965–67, 2003–04 and 2009–10; Republic of Vietnam Cross of Gallantry with Palm, 1965–70; Republic of Vietnam Civil Action Honor Medal First Class, 1969–71
- Website: Official Website

Commanders
- Current commander: COL Mark E. Bush
- Notable commanders: John R. Deane Jr.; Ellis W. Williamson; Anthony E. Herbert (battalion commander)

Insignia
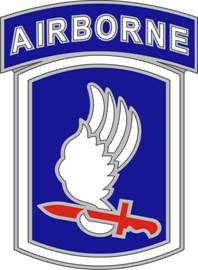
- Combat service identification badge

- Brigade Distinctive Unit Insignia

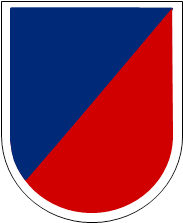
- Brigade Beret Flash

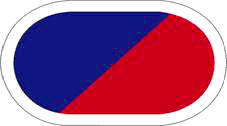
- Brigade Background Trimming

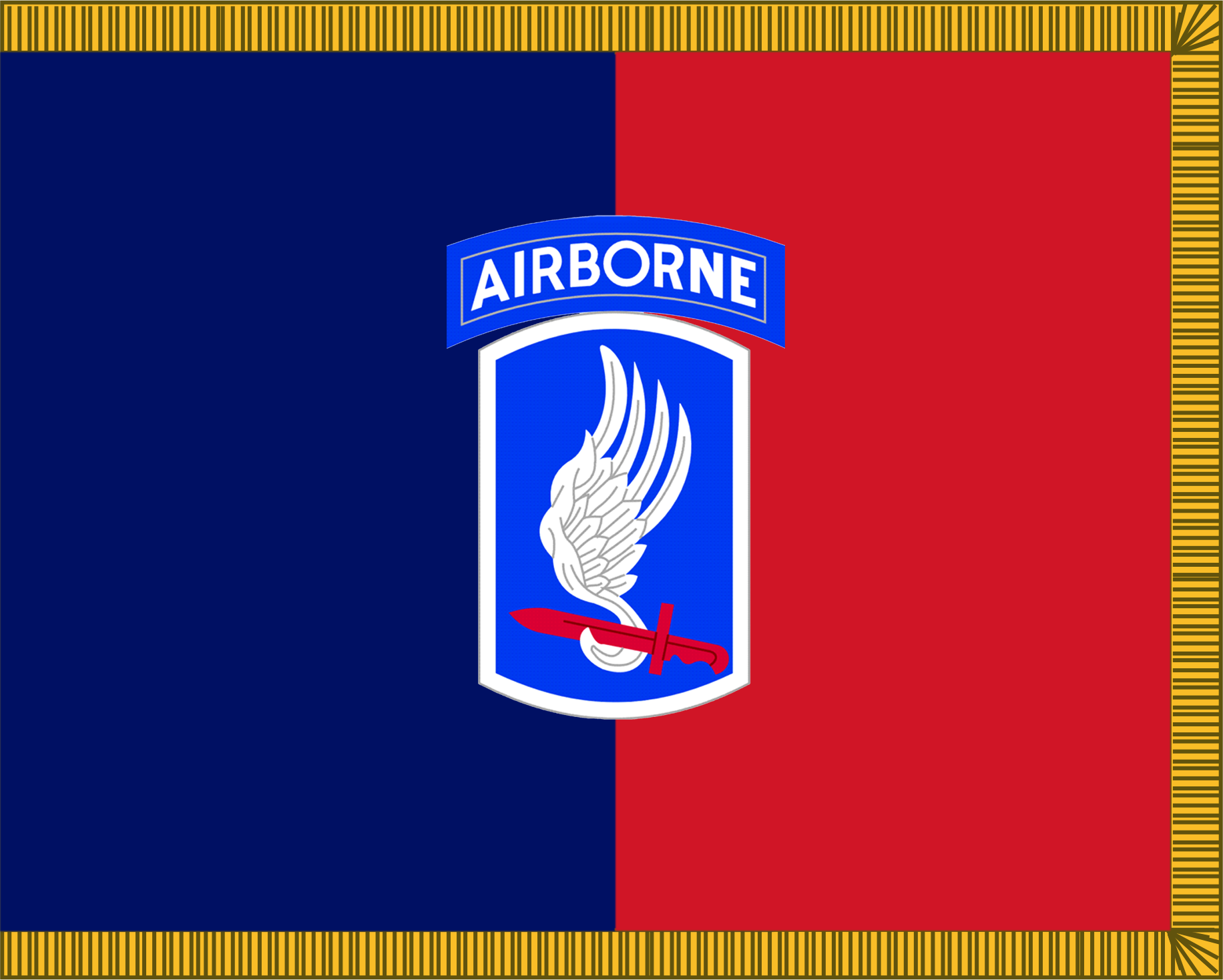
- 173rd Airborne Infantry Brigade Flag

The 173rd Mobile Brigade Combat Team (Airborne) ("Sky Soldiers") is an airborne mobile Brigade Combat Team (MBCT) of the United States Army based in Vicenza, Italy. It is the United States European Command's conventional airborne strategic response force for Europe.

Activated in 1915, as the 173rd Infantry Brigade, the unit saw service in World War II but is best known for its actions during the Vietnam War. The brigade was the first major United States Army ground formation deployed to South Vietnam, serving there from 1965 to 1971 and losing 1,533 soldiers. Noted for its roles in Operation Hump and Operation Junction City, the 173rd is best known for the Battle of Dak To, where it suffered heavy casualties in close combat with North Vietnamese forces. Brigade members received over 7,700 decorations, including more than 6,000 Purple Hearts. The brigade returned to the United States in 1971, where the 1st and 2nd Battalion, 503rd Infantry, were absorbed into the 3rd Brigade, 101st Airborne Division (Airmobile), and the 3rd Battalion, 319th Field Artillery was reassigned to Division Artillery in the 101st. The remaining units of the 173rd were inactivated.

Since its reactivation in 2000, the brigade served five tours in the Middle East in support of the war on terror. The 173rd participated in the early invasion and occupation of Iraq during Operation Iraqi Freedom in 2003–04, and had four tours in Afghanistan in support of Operation Enduring Freedom in 2005–06, 2007–08, 2009–10, and 2012–13. The 173rd Airborne Brigade has received 21 campaign streamers and several unit awards, including the Presidential Unit Citation for its actions during the Battle of Dak To.

== Organization ==
The 173rd Airborne Brigade serves as the conventional airborne strategic response force for Europe. It was a subordinate unit of the U.S. Army's V Corps and after June 2013, subordinate to US Army Europe.

The 173rd Airborne Brigade currently has the following:

- Headquarters and Headquarters Company"Headhunters"located at Caserma Del Din, Vicenza, Italy
- 1st Battalion, 503rd Infantry Regiment"First Rock"located at Caserma Carlo Ederle, Vicenza, Italy
- 2nd Battalion,503rd Infantry Regiment"The Rock"located at Caserma Del Din, Vicenza, Italy
- 3rd Battalion, 504th Infantry Regiment"Blue Devils"located at Grafenwoehr Training Area, Bavaria, Germany
- 4th Battalion, 319th Field Artillery Regiment"Loyalty"located at Grafenwoehr Training Area, Bavaria, Germany
- 173rd Combat Engineer Company"Daggers In"located at Caserma Del Din, Vicenza, Italy
- 173rd Light Support Battalion"To our Utmost"located at Caserma Del Din, Vicenza, Italy

All of these units are airborne qualified, making the 173rd Airborne Brigade the only separate airborne MBCT in the United States Army.

== History ==
=== World Wars ===
The 173rd Infantry Brigade was constituted on 5 August 1917 as an infantry brigade and organized on 25 August at Camp Pike, Arkansas, as an element of the 87th Division along with the 174th Infantry Brigade. The brigade deployed to France along with the rest of the division in September 1918, but it did not participate in any campaigns and never saw combat, instead being utilized as a pool of laborers and reinforcements for frontline units. Four months later, the brigade returned to the United States, and was demobilized with the rest of the division in January 1919 at Camp Dix, New Jersey. Commanders during the war included:

- BG Robert Campbell Van Vliet, 25 August 1917 – 8 June 1918
- COL John O'Shea, 9 June 1918 – 14 July 1918
- BG Otho B. Rosenbaum, 15 July 1918 – 26 July 1918
- COL John O'Shea, 27 July 1918 – 28 July 1918
- BG Otho B. Rosenbaum, 29 July 1918 – 19 September 1918
- COL John Shea, 20 September 1918 – 2 December 1918
- BG George Herbert Harries, 3 December 1918
- COL John Shea, 4 December 1918 – 20 December 1918
- BG Marcus D. Cronin, 21 December 1918 – 9 January 1919
- COL John Shea, 10 January 1919 – 19 January 1919
- BG Marcus D. Cronin, 20 January 1919 – 8 February 1919

On 24 June 1921, the unit was reconstituted as the Headquarters and Headquarters Company (HHC), 173rd Infantry Brigade, and was assigned to the Organized Reserve Corps and the 87th Division at Shreveport, Louisiana. It was reorganized in December 1921 at Mobile, Alabama, redesignated on 23 March 1925 as the HHC 173rd Brigade, and redesignated as HHC 173rd Infantry Brigade on 24 August 1936.

During World War II, brigades were eliminated from divisions. Consequently, the HHC 173rd Infantry Brigade was designated as the 87th Reconnaissance Troop in February 1942 and activated on 15 December 1942. Though the brigade in name did not exist during the war, the redesignation meant that it carried the lineage of the 87th Reconnaissance Troop, and when the brigade was reactivated, it would include the troop's lineage and campaign streamers. The troop entered combat in 1944 and fought in three European campaigns; central Europe, the Rhineland and Ardennes-Alsace operations. The maneuver battalions of the Vietnam era 173rd trace their lineage to the 503rd Parachute Infantry Regiment, which successfully assaulted the fortress island of Corregidor in the Philippines by parachute and waterborne operations, thereby earning the nickname "The Rock". After the war, the troop reverted to reserve status and was posted at Birmingham, Alabama from 1947 until 1951. On 1 December 1951, the troop was inactivated and released from its assignment to the 87th Infantry Division.

=== Re-creation as airborne brigade ===
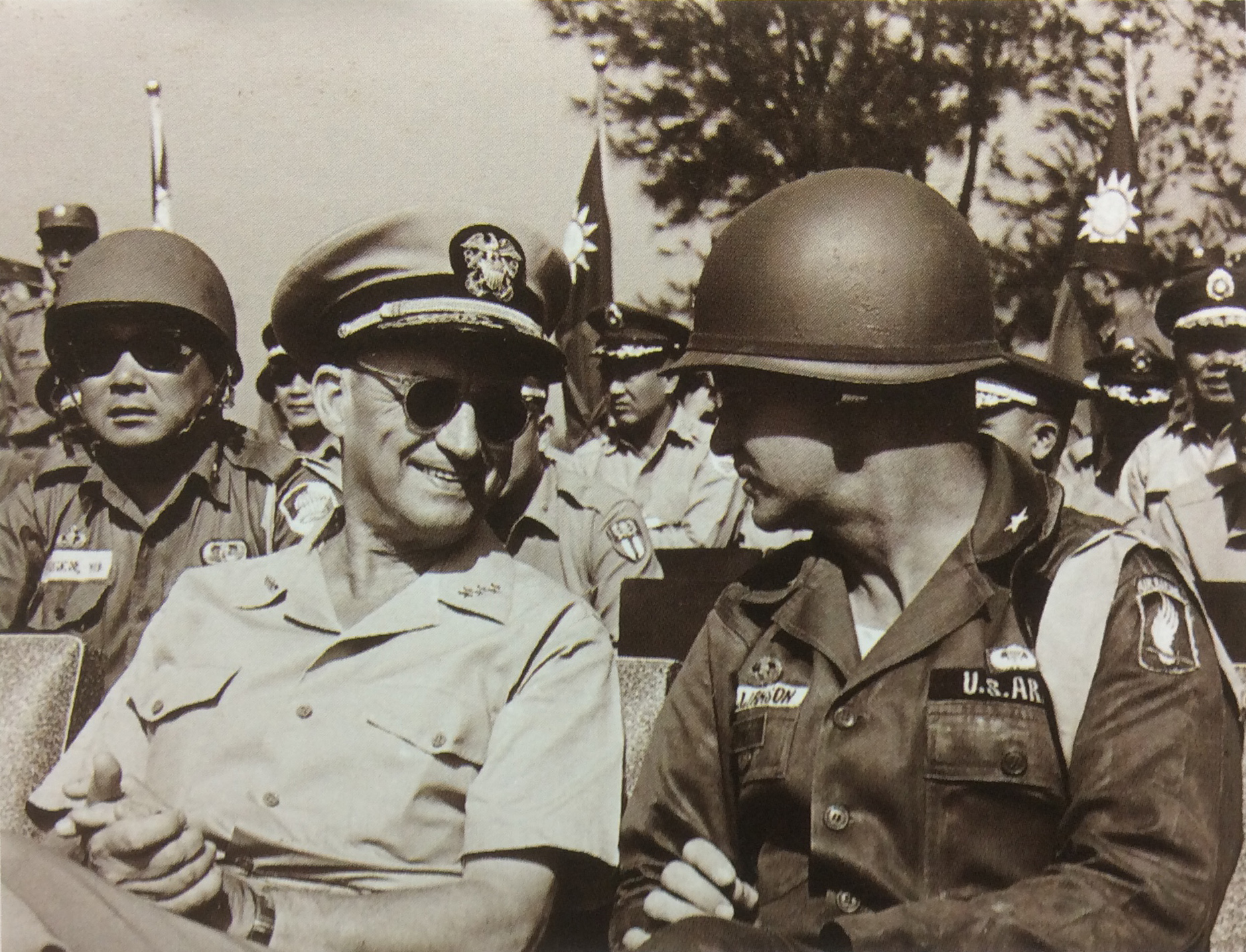
Brigadier General Ellis W. Williamson (right), commander of the 173rd Airborne Brigade, presided over the Tien Bing No. 4 exercise in Taiwan, 1963.

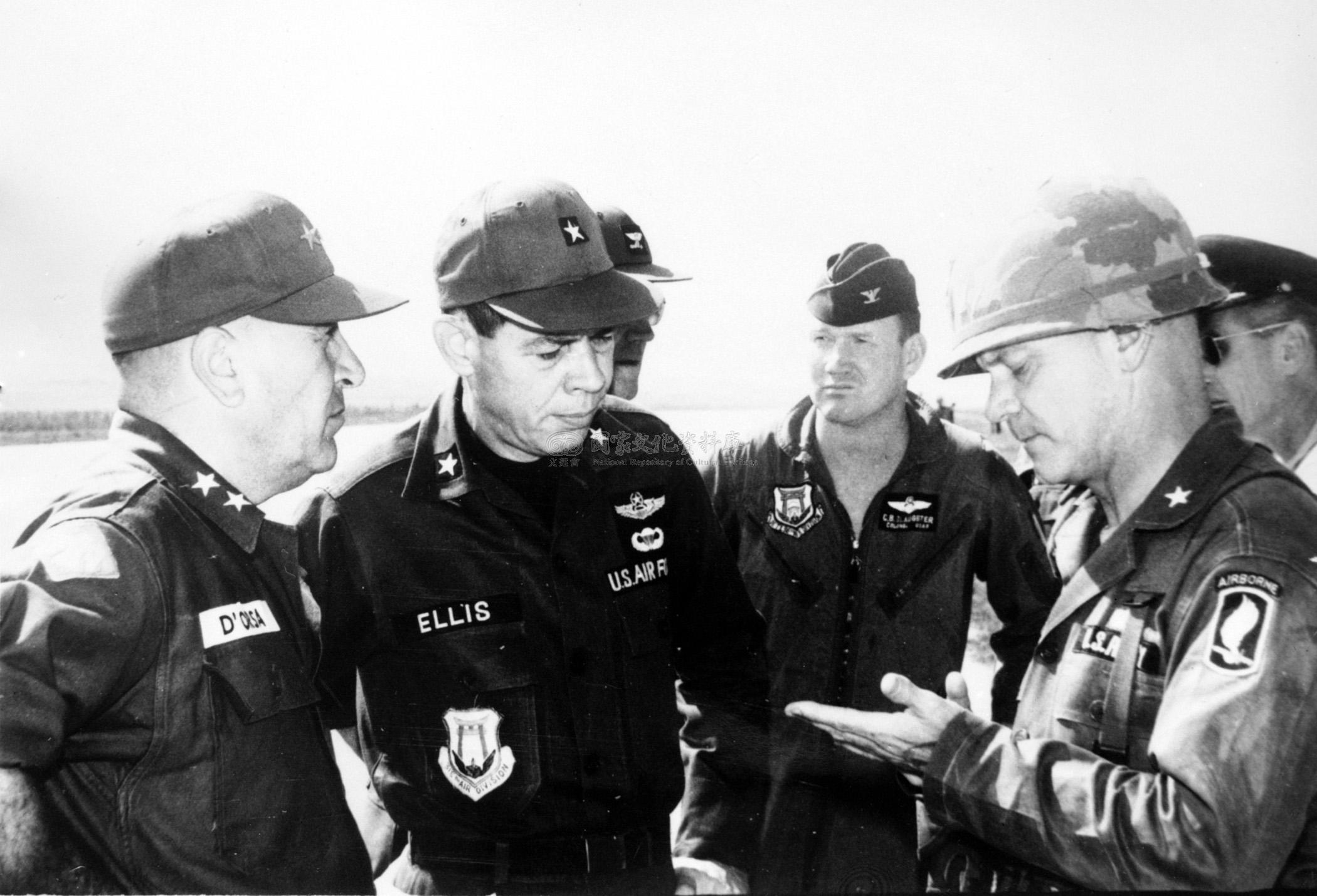
The Tien Bing No. 6 exercise was held in Changhua, Taiwan. Airborne training exercise chief Major General Charles S. D'Orsa (left) Airlift Force Commander Brigadier General Richard H. Ellis and the 173rd airborne Brigade Commander Brigadier General Ellis W. Williamson (right) held talks in the exercise field, 1964

From 1961 to 1963, the Army began reorganizing its force so that each division would have a similar structure, which would vary depending on the type of division it was. This move was called the Reorganization Objective Army Division (ROAD) plan. The plan eliminated regiments but reintroduced brigades to the Army's structure, allowing three brigades to a division. The reorganization also allowed for the use of "separate" brigades which had no division headquarters and could be used for missions that did not require an entire division. The 173rd Brigade was selected to become a separate brigade and a special airborne task force, which could deploy rapidly and act independently. It was then designed uniquely from other separate brigades. The 173rd was the only separate brigade to have support formations permanently assigned to it, though other separate brigades would receive support elements of their own a year later. The brigade was also the only separate brigade to receive its own tank company, in the form of Company D, 16th Armor. Consistent with regimental combat teams activated before them, these separate brigades were given their own shoulder sleeve insignia. The soldiers of the 173rd Airborne Brigade created a patch with a wing on it to symbolize their status as an airborne unit, along with red, white, and blue, the national colors of the United States. The SSI would be given to them in May 1963.

On 26 March 1963, the 173rd Airborne Brigade (Separate) was assigned to the Regular Army and activated on Okinawa. Brigadier General Ellis W. Williamson took command of the unit, which was chartered to serve as the quick reaction force for the Pacific Command. Under Williamson, the unit trained extensively, making mass parachute jumps. They earned the nickname Tien Bing (Chinese: 天兵), literally Sky Soldiers, from the Taiwanese paratroopers. During their time in Okinawa, they prided themselves as the "toughest fighting men in Okinawa, if not the entire U.S. Armed Forces". They took their theme song from the television series Rawhide. As the Pacific quick-reaction force, they were the first brigade to be sent to South Vietnam two years later when hostilities escalated there.

=== Vietnam War ===
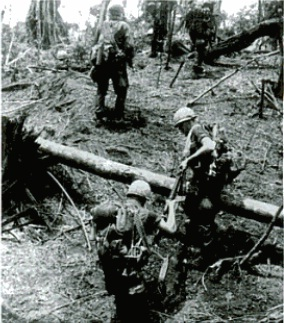
Paratroopers patrolling along the Song Be during Operation Silver City, March 1966

The brigade arrived in South Vietnam on 7 May 1965, the first major ground combat unit of the United States Army to serve in the country. Williamson boldly predicted on arrival that his men would defeat the Viet Cong (VC) quickly and that they "would be back in Okinawa by Christmas". The 1st Brigade, 101st Airborne Division; the 2nd Brigade, 1st Infantry Division; and the 1st Cavalry Division quickly followed the 173rd into Vietnam, the first of what would eventually be 25 U.S. Army brigades to serve in the country. As larger US Army commands were established in Vietnam, the brigade was assigned to the III Corps and II Corps tactical zone, which they would serve in for the next six years. The brigade was put under the command of II Field Force, Vietnam.

The 1st and 2nd Battalions, 503rd Infantry were the first Army combat units from the 173rd sent into South Vietnam, accompanied by the 3rd Battalion, 319th Artillery. They were supported by the 173rd Support Battalion, 173rd Engineer Company, Troop E/17th Cavalry and Company D/16th Armor. The 1st Battalion, Royal Australian Regiment and the 161st Battery, Royal New Zealand Artillery were attached to the brigade for one year in 1965. Late in August 1966, the 173rd received another infantry battalion, the 4th Battalion, 503rd Infantry from Fort Campbell, Kentucky. The 3rd Battalion, 503rd joined the brigade at Tuy Hoa Province in September 1967 following the former's activation and training at Fort Bragg, North Carolina. The 173rd was also assigned Company N (Ranger), 75th Infantry. At its peak of its deployment in Vietnam, the 173rd Airborne Brigade (Separate) comprised over 7,000 soldiers.

The brigade was the first unit sent into War Zone D to destroy enemy base camps, introducing the use of small Long Range Reconnaissance Patrols. On 8 November 1965, the 173rd took part in Operation Hump, just north of Biên Hòa on the outskirts of Saigon, the capital of South Vietnam. They were ambushed by approximately 1,200 VC fighters, suffering 48 deaths. The unit fought in the Iron Triangle, a VC stronghold north of Saigon, seeing many engagements with VC forces during that time. In January 1966 they launched Operation Marauder, the first U.S. military operation in the Plain of Reeds. They participated in Operation Crimp in 1966, a failed attempt to root out VC forces from the Củ Chi tunnels.

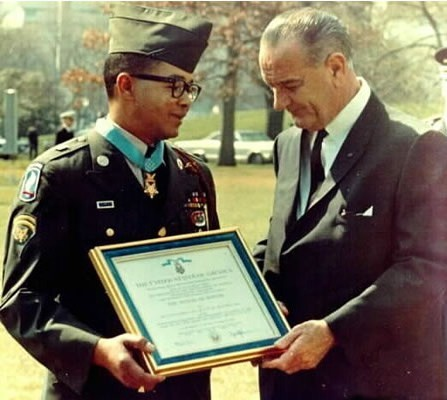
Specialist Six Lawrence Joel from the 173rd Brigade, receiving the Medal of Honor

The attached helicopter unit became the Casper Aviation Platoon, befitting a separate infantry brigade as the only separate aviation platoon deployed in Vietnam. Casper platoon was part of the HHC 173rd Airborne Brigade and its members wore the brigade patch. The attached Assault Helicopter Company, the 335th AHC, the "Cowboys", deployed with the brigade all over Vietnam into mid-1968 and comprised the Airmobile capability along with the Caspers. Soldiers of the brigade became involved in Operation Attleboro in fall of 1966, an operation that started out as a small search and destroy mission north of Saigon, but eventually involved 22,000 troops from 21 battalions. Soldiers of the brigade also took part in smaller humanitarian missions in between major combat operations.

On 22 February 1967, the 173rd conducted Operation Junction City, the only combat parachute jump of the Vietnam War. The operation saw three brigades controlling eight battalions dropped by helicopters and US Air Force aircraft into War Zone C, in Tây Ninh Province. During the battle, the brigade operated out of the northeastern part of the war zone along with the 196th Infantry Brigade (Separate), as four other brigades from the 1st and 25th Infantry Divisions attempted to surround and destroy the 9th Division in the War Zone. The operation was a success, and the battered VC division fled. In August of that year, the brigade received its distinctive unit insignia. The soldiers chose to have it contain a parachute and dagger to symbolize their participation in Operation Junction City and the other heavy fighting they had been through. The DUI was also inscribed "Sky Soldiers" as homage to the nickname that the Taiwanese soldiers had given them.

==== Dak To ====
In mid-1967, the 4th Infantry Division's 1st and 2nd Brigades conducting Operation Francis Marion in western Kon Tum Province were making heavy contact with People's Army of Vietnam (PAVN) forces. These contacts prompted division commander Major General William R. Peers to request reinforcement and, as a result, on 17 June, two battalions of Brigadier General John R. Deane's 173rd Airborne Brigade were moved into the Dak To area to begin sweeping the jungle-covered mountains in Operation Greeley. The 173rd had been operating near Bien Hoa Air Base outside Saigon and had been in combat only against the VC. Prior to its deployment to the highlands, Peers' operations officer, Colonel William J. Livsey, attempted to warn the Airborne officers of the hazards of campaigning in the Central Highlands. He also advised them that PAVN regulars were a much better equipped and motivated force than the VC. These warnings, however, made little impression on the paratroopers, who were about to become victims of their own overconfidence.

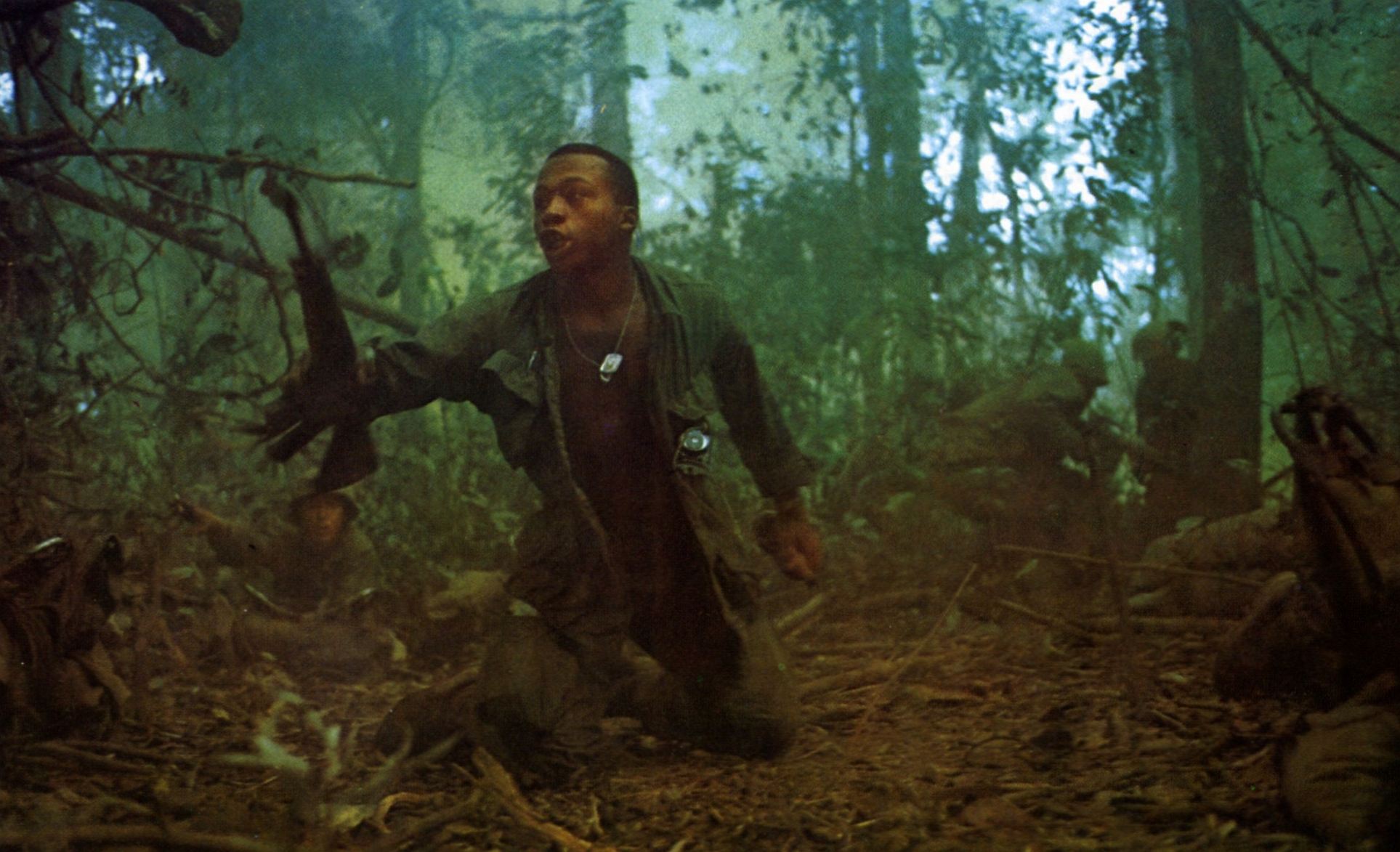
1st Battalion, 503rd Infantry, 173rd Airborne Brigade soldiers battle for Hill 882, southwest of Dak To.

On 20 June, Company C, 2nd Battalion (Airborne), 503rd Infantry (C/2-503) discovered the bodies of a Special Forces CIDG unit that had been missing for four days on Hill 1338, the dominant hill mass south of Dak To. Supported by A/2-503, the Americans moved up the hill and set up for the night. At 06:58 the following morning, Alpha Company began moving alone up a ridge finger and triggered an ambush by the 6th Battalion of the 24th PAVN Regiment. Charlie Company was ordered to support, but heavy vegetation and difficult terrain made movement extremely difficult. Artillery support was rendered ineffective by the limited range of visibility. Close air support was impossible for the same reasons. Alpha Company managed to survive repeated attacks throughout the day and night, but the cost was heavy. Of the 137 men that comprised the unit, 76 had been killed and another 23 wounded. A search of the battlefield revealed only 15 dead North Vietnamese.

In response to the destruction of Alpha Company, MACV ordered additional forces into the area. On 23 June, the 1st Battalion, 12th Cavalry Regiment (1st Brigade, 1st Air Cavalry Division) arrived to bolster the 173rd. The following day, the Army of the Republic of Vietnam's (ARVN) elite 1st Airborne Task Force (the 5th and 8th Battalions) and the 3rd Brigade, 1st Air Cavalry Division (5th Battalion, 7th Cavalry Regiment; 2nd Battalion, 12th Cavalry; and an additional infantry battalion) arrived to conduct search and destroy operations north and northeast of Kon Tum. General Deane sent his forces 20 kilometres (12 mi) west and southwest of Dak To to search for the PAVN 24th Regiment. By October, the 173rd, the 4th Infantry Division, and six ARVN battalions were moved to Dak To. The PAVN, in turn, had moved almost 6,000 troops in four infantry regiments and one artillery regiment.

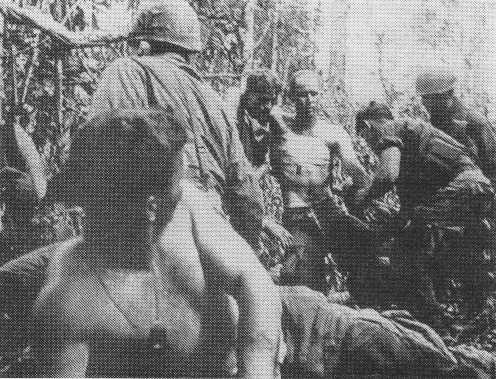
U.S. wounded being moved to aid station during battle for Hill 882

The battle around Dak To became more costly as 4-503 of the 173rd was ordered to occupy Hill 823, south of Ben Het Camp, for the construction of Fire Support Base. Only the battalion's Company B was available for the attack, which was borne by helicopter. The company was able to take the hill but suffered 9 dead and 28 wounded. The following morning Bravo Company was relieved by Lieutenant Colonel David J. Schumacher's 1–503, which (against the admonitions of Colonel Livsey) was divided into two small task forces. Task Force Black consisted of Charlie Company supported by two platoons of Dog Company and Task Force Blue which was composed of Alpha Company and the remaining platoon of Dog Company. Task Force Black left Hill 823 to find the PAVN who had attacked B/4-503. At 08:28 on 11 November, after leaving their overnight laager and following a PAVN communications wire, the force was ambushed by the 8th and 9th Battalions of the PAVN 66th Regiment and had to fight for its life. Task Force Blue drew the job of going to the relief of the beleaguered task force; however, Task Force Blue ran into resistance and was pinned down by enemy fire on all sides. C/4-503 was then assigned the mission of relieving Task Force Black and they too encountered significant PAVN fire, but they made it, reaching the trapped men at 15:37. U.S. losses were 20 killed, 154 wounded, and two missing.

Following an attack on the Đắk Tô Base, and actions on hill 882 by the 1-503rd that saw 7 men dead and 34 wounded, 330 men of 2-503 moved in to assault Hill 875. At 10:30, as the Americans moved to within 300 metres (984 ft) of the crest, PAVN machine gunners opened fire on the advancing paratroopers. The Vietnamese then unleashed B-40 rockets and 57 mm recoilless rifle fire on the Americans. The paratroopers attempted to continue the advance, but the PAVN, well concealed in interconnected bunkers and trenches, opened fire with small arms and grenades. At 14:30 PAVN troops hidden at the bottom of the hill launched a massed assault from the rear. Unknown to the Americans, they had walked into a carefully prepared ambush by the 2nd Battalion of the 174th PAVN Regiment. Soon, U.S. air strikes and artillery fire were being called in, but they had little effect on the battle because of the dense foliage on the hillside. Resupply became a necessity, because of high ammunition expenditures and lack of water, but was impossible to accomplish: Six UH-1 helicopters were shot down or badly damaged that afternoon trying to get to 2–503.

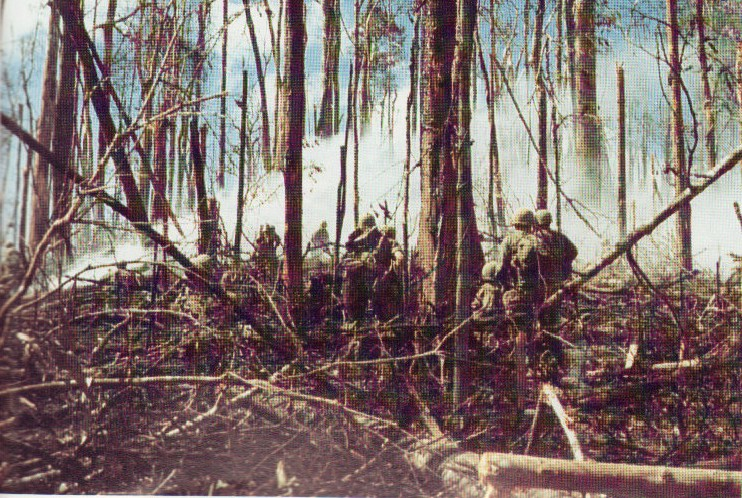
U.S. troops in combat on Hill 875

The next morning the three companies of 4-503 were chosen to set out and relieve the men on Hill 875. Because of intense PAVN sniper and mortar fire (and the terrain), it took until nightfall for the relief force to reach the beleaguered battalion. On the afternoon of 21 November, both battalions moved out to take the crest. During fierce, close-quarters fighting, some of the paratroopers made it into the PAVN trench line but were ordered to pull back as darkness fell.

The following day was spent in launching airstrikes and a heavy artillery bombardment against the hilltop, totally denuding it of cover. On 23 November, 2-503 and 4-503 were ordered to renew their assault while the 1st Battalion, 12th Infantry assaulted 875 from the south. This time the Americans gained the crest, but the PAVN had already abandoned their positions, leaving only a few dozen charred bodies and weapons.

The battle of Hill 875 had cost 2-503 87 killed, 130 wounded, and three missing. 4-503 suffered 28 killed 123 wounded, and four missing. Combined with noncombatant losses, this represented one-fifth of the 173rd Airborne Brigade's total strength. For its combined actions during operations around Dak To, the 173rd Airborne Brigade was awarded the Presidential Unit Citation. 340 of the 570 173rd Airborne troops who attacked the hill became casualties.

==== 1968–1971 ====
The intense fighting during the Battle of Dak To took a heavy human toll on the 173rd. While several of its units, including the 2-503rd and A/3-319th were ordered to Tuy Hòa to repair and refit, the 173rd was transferred to Camp Radcliff in An Khê and Bong Son areas during 1968, seeing very little action while the combat ineffective elements of the brigade were rebuilt. Company D, 16th Armor was engaged in a battle that took place on 4 March 1968 at North Tuy Hòa. During the day, the company lost 8 men killed and 21 wounded. An estimated 2 enemy battalions, the VC 85th Main Force and the PAVN 95th Regiment, were rendered ineffective as they had 297 killed, with D/16 Armor receiving credit for killing 218. The company commander, Captain Robert Helmick, was awarded the DSC. One of the few combat operations that brigade conducted during this time was an amphibious assault against PAVN/VC forces as part of an operation to clear the rice-growing lowlands along the Bong Son littoral.

In mid-1968 at the instigation of II Corps commander General Lữ Mộng Lan, I Field Force, Vietnam commander General William R. Peers paired with the Brigade with the ARVN 22nd Division in Bình Định Province in what was almost a replica of Operation Fairfax. The participating US units brought substantial air, artillery, engineer, and other support to the combined endeavor from their parent units, and American and Vietnamese commanders generally colocated command posts, shared a common area of operation, and planned and carried out operations together. In the process the American officers tried to increase pressure on local enemy forces through intensive patrolling and to encourage ARVN battalion, company, and platoon-level leadership through longer, more decentralized operations. Vietnamization, as later conceived in 1969, was not an objective, and, in fact, the entire effort represented a return to the old strategy of pacification, with American combat operations now tied much closer to the overall task of local security. Several months later, encouraged by the apparent success of joint operations with the 22nd Division, Peers directed the organization of a Task Force South with two battalions of the Brigade "pairing up" these units with several Ranger battalions and the 44th and 53rd Regiments of the ARVN 23rd Division south of Bình Định. The success of the program varied greatly from unit to unit, but the programs of the 173rd and Task Force South were generally regarded as effective. In April 1969 Brigade commander Brig. Gen. John W. Barnes officially ended the unit's pair-off program and replaced it with Operation Washington Green, an intensive area security effort with territorial and paramilitary forces in Bình Định Province. In essence, Washington Green was a second Operation Fairfax, but without the presence of ARVN regulars. Washington Green proved to be the final American campaign in Bình Định Province, and its greatest achievement may have been in training an impressive number of territorial and paramilitary forces. However, in the long run the operation appeared no more successful than Fairfax's efforts to clean up Gia Dinh Province around Saigon prior to the Tet Offensive. Bình Định was not easily pacified by military action alone. American and Vietnamese local intelligence was poor, the area was a traditional VC stronghold, and province and district officials were never able to eliminate the local VC infrastructure. As Peers' successor in March 1969, Lt. Gen. Charles A. Corcoran, reflected, "Barnes may have just been keeping the lid on the situation." After the brigade finally left South Vietnam in 1971, the greater portion of the province reverted to VC control.

The unit then served in An Khê until mid-1969, seeing little in the way of heavy fighting. From April 1969 until its withdrawal from South Vietnam in 1971, the brigade served in Bình Định Province. During more than six years of continuous combat, the brigade earned 14 campaign streamers and four unit citations, the Presidential Unit Citation, a Meritorious Unit Commendation, a Republic of Vietnam Cross of Gallantry, and a Republic of Vietnam Civil Action Honor Medal. Sky Soldiers serving in Vietnam received 13 Medals of Honor, 32 Distinguished Service Crosses, 1,736 Silver Stars and more than 6,000 Purple Hearts. The 173rd incurred 1,533 deaths and around 6,000 wounded.

After widely publicized reports by battalion commander Lt. Col. Anthony Herbert, investigators confirmed that military interrogators of the 173rd Airborne Brigade "repeatedly beat prisoners, tortured them with electric shocks and forced water down their throats". A U.S. Army report detailed a pattern of "cruelty and maltreatment" between March 1968 and October 1969. Interrogators also employed a technique called the "water rag", which involved pouring water onto a rag covering the captive's nose and mouth, which creates the sensatation of drowning and can lead to death by asphyxiation. Herbert was relieved of his command shortly after reporting to his superior the war crimes he had witnessed. A former counterintelligence officer gave a statement under oath that "he saw interrogators punch and kick prisoners, beat them with sticks, administer electrical shocks and urinate on them."

=== Redeployment and inactivation 1971–72 ===
From April until August 1971, the unit underwent the process of redeployment to Fort Campbell, Kentucky, the first time that the 173rd Airborne Brigade in name had returned to the United States since 1942.

After Vietnam, the Army retained the 173rd Airborne Brigade as a quick deploying contingency brigade. However, with the ending of conscription following America's disengagement from Vietnam, many of the Army's formations had to be rebuilt for the volunteer force. One of these was the 101st Airborne Division, which had also been redeployed to Fort Campbell. It was decided that the 173rd would be used to help rebuild the division, which had been converted into an airmobile formation during the Vietnam War. The brigade was inactivated on 14 January 1972 at the fort, and its assets were used to form the 3rd Brigade, 101st Airborne Division, a parachute component within the airmobile 101st. The 3rd Brigade went off jump status on 1 April 1974, the same date as the Airmobile Badge (Air Assault Badge as of 4 October 1974) was introduced.

=== Reactivation and preparation for Iraq ===
In the late 1990s, Army leaders including General Eric Shinseki began shifting the Army force toward brigade centered operations. All separate brigades had been inactivated in the 1990s as part of the U.S. Army's drawdown following the end of the Cold War. These inactivations, along with subsequent reorganization of U.S. Army divisions, saw several divisional brigades stationed in bases that were far from the division's headquarters and support units. These brigades had difficulty operating without support from higher headquarters.

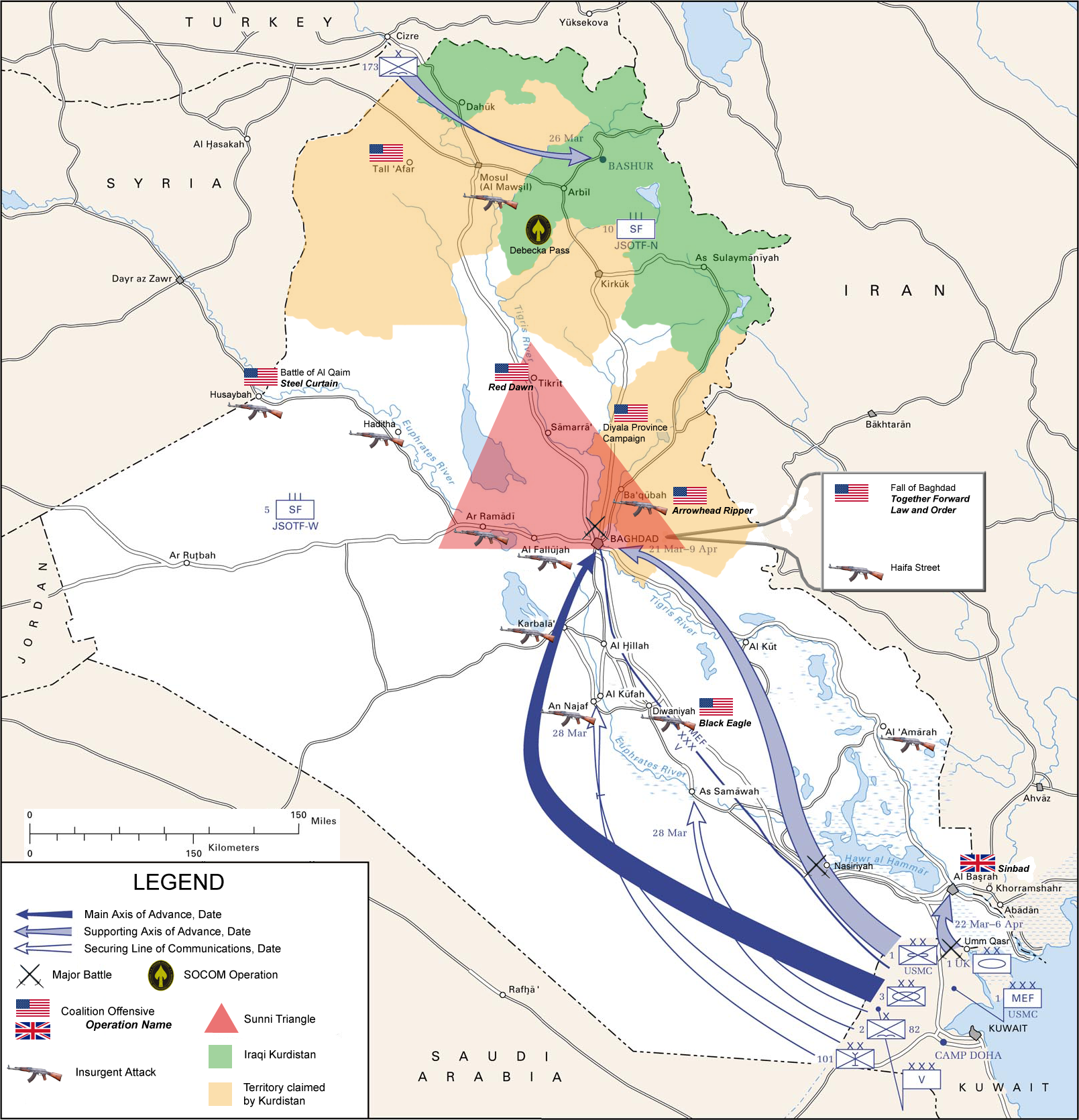
Battle plan for the Iraq War, with the 173rd attacking the northern areas of the country

It was Shinseki's idea to reactivate a few separate brigades and assign them their own support and sustainment units, which would allow them to function independently of division-level headquarters. These formations were termed "brigade combat teams". Such units could be stationed in bases far from major commands, not requiring division-level unit support, an advantage in places like Alaska and Europe, where stationing entire divisions was unnecessary or impractical. The first of the separate brigades was the 172nd Infantry Brigade, activated in 1998. The 173rd Airborne Brigade was reactivated in 2000 at Caserma Ederle in Vicenza, Italy, using the assets of the SETAF Infantry brigade, primarily the 1st Battalion, 508th Infantry and Battery D, 319th Field Artillery. Not long after its reactivation, elements were deployed to Kosovo as part of Operation Rapid Guardian in support of Kosovo Force (KFOR).

In 2002, 2nd Battalion, 503rd Infantry (2-503rd) activated, providing a second infantry battalion. The unit finally reached "initial operating capability" on 14 March 2003, with all units ready for deployment. It would be in combat 12 days later.

In 2003, as preparations were being made for Operation Iraqi Freedom, the 173rd Airborne Brigade was assigned to be a part of an assault from the north of Iraq. The original plan was for the 173rd to be attached to the 4th Infantry Division as a flexible force of airborne troops to complement the heavy weapons of the division's three brigades. Supported by the 1st Infantry Division and the 10th Special Forces Group, the 4th Infantry Division was to assemble in Turkey and use its heavy mechanized brigades to attack through Tikrit and eventually assist V Corps, which would attack from the south, in surrounding Baghdad. However, this plan fell through when the government of Turkey would not allow offensive operations to be conducted from its soil, and the entire 4th Infantry Division was left stuck on ships in the Mediterranean for the opening of the operation. This meant that the entire northern front of the war would be conducted by the 173rd Airborne Brigade and Army special forces operating with aircraft from Europe as their only supply line. As the brigade had no heavy or mechanized forces and only a few Humvees and an artillery battery, heavier forces were attached to it in the form of two companies of M113 Armored Personnel Carriers, M1 Abrams tanks, and M2 Bradleys from a task force of 1st Battalion, 63rd Armor, which was attached to the brigade. Task Force 1-63 consisted of HHC/1-63rd Armor, C/1-63rd Armor and B/2-2nd Infantry. The force also received force field artillery headquarters from the 2nd Battalion, 15th Field Artillery, which brought a Tactical Operations Center, a Q-36 counterfire radar and Combat Observation and Lasing Team (COLT)a pair of Dragoneye Unmanned Aerial Vehicles from the US Marine Corps, to be operated by the Brigades Ground Surveillance Systems (GSS) team.

The 173rd Airborne Brigade was made part of Task Force Viking, a special operations task force that contained elements of the 10th Mountain Division and the 10th Special Forces Group. The use of the 173rd as a part of a special operations task force was a unique first in U.S. Army history. This force was assisted by Kurdish rebels in northern Iraq and tasked with attacking key airfield and oil production positions deep in northern Iraq. The brigade would take off from Aviano Air Base in Italy, a 4 1/2-hour flight from northern Iraq. As the preparations for the brigade were in their final stages, it moved 10 trains and 300 trucks worth of equipment to the air base, as well as 120 busloads of soldiers. Though the brigade's movement was impeded by Italian protestors, the Italian police provided escort operations to the brigade and ensured that it reached the Air Base without incident, and was not significantly delayed. Operation Iraqi Freedom began on 20 March with V Corps, consisting of the 101st Airborne Division, 82nd Airborne Division, and 3rd Infantry Division making a forceful push from the south, beginning the Iraq War. A few days later, the 173rd and 10th Special Forces Group departed for northern Iraq.

=== Operation Iraqi Freedom I ===
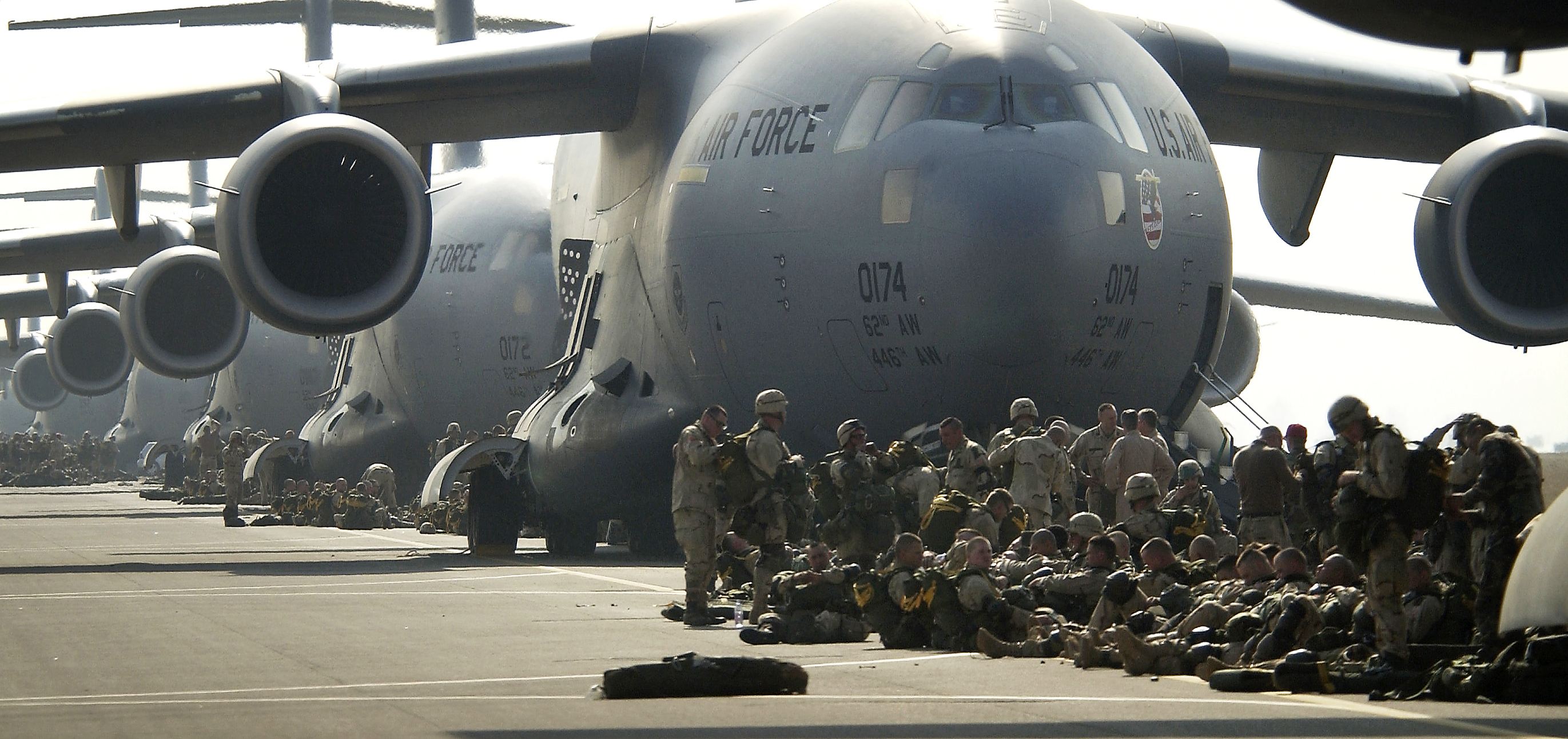
U.S. Army paratroopers prepare to board a C-17 Globemaster III into the Kurdish-controlled area of northern Iraq. This was the first combat insertion of paratroopers using a C-17.

On 26 March 2003, 954 soldiers of the 173rd Airborne Brigade conducted a combat jump from C-17 aircraft onto Bashur Airfield in Northern Iraq under the command of Colonel Mayville. The jump took a total of 58 seconds, though 32 paratroopers were unable to jump because they would have landed too far from the rest of the force. The force had been strung out over a 10,000-yard drop zone, and it took 15 hours before it was completely assembled. In the weeks before there had been heavy rain and the mud created problems for those doing the jump. The paratroopers secured the airfield, allowing the C-17s to land and bring in the heavy armor and the 1–63rd Armor contingents. They jumped from aircraft of the 62nd Airlift Wing, 446th Airlift Wing, 437th Airlift Wing and the 315th Airlift Wing ( this included the 728th Airlift Squadron), along with a Tactical Air Control Party of USAF Airmen from the 4th Air Support Operations Squadron and the 786th Security Forces Squadron. Over the next 96 hours, the wing landed in the remaining 1,200 soldiers of the brigade as well as their vehicles. By 29 March the entire brigade was in Iraq and ready to conduct offensive operations.

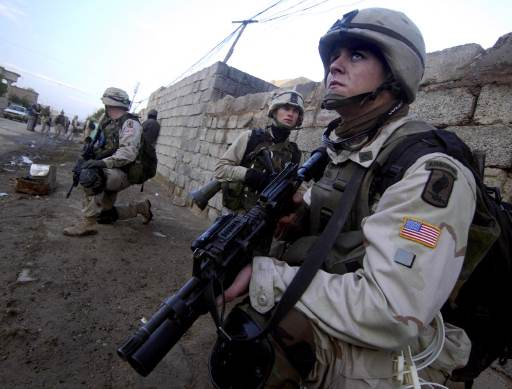
Soldiers of the 173rd during Operation Bayonet Lightning in Iraq, 2003.

The next day, American forces advanced to Kirkuk during Operation Option North, hoping to control oil fields and military airfields in and around the city. Controlling the oil fields had been a specific operational goal of the Task Force because they were viewed as the most valuable strategic asset in northern Iraq. Between 30 March and 2 April, the 173rd Airborne Brigade, along with the Special Forces detachment and the Kurdish forces, engaged and destroyed the 2nd, 4th, 8th and 38th Iraqi Infantry divisions as well as a force loyal to Ansar al-Islam. The brigade used field artillery assets, as well as coordinated airstrikes to attack Iraqi Republican Guard units defending the city. Within a week these units began to fall apart due to desertions. On 10 April the brigade was able to move into the city, securing it after a short urban battle. The entire battle for Kirkuk cost the brigade only nine casualties. During the operation, some of the troops discovered at least two caches of Iraqi gold, totaling more than 2,000 bars. The unit then took part in Operation Peninsula Strike, quelling Ba'ath party resistance and other insurgent groups. These operations, though successful, would have been more effective if the 4th Infantry Division's four heavy brigades were able to enter Iraq through Turkey as originally planned. 4th ID had to relocate their forces from Turkey to Kuwait and were subsequently slowed down in Baghdad. V Corps was not able to surround Baghdad as quickly as it had hoped because of a lack of available forces in the north. The resulting wear and tear of 4th ID's M1 Abrams and M2 Bradleys made them an ineffective unit in tight urban areas such as Jar Salah. Because their heavily armored tanks required so much maintenance, the 173rd incorporated much of 4th ID's area of operation into their own. The 173rd secured these areas with company sized detachments, often patrolling the 4th ID's sectors with two unarmored M998 cargo Humvees at any given time.

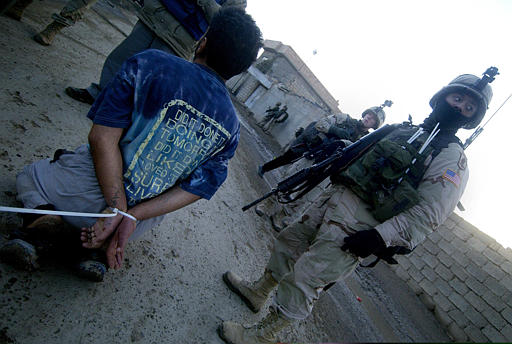
173rd soldiers detain suspected Iraqi insurgents.

After the end of major combat operations in mid-2003, the 173rd Airborne Brigade did not engage in any major battles, though it was regularly involved in skirmishes with Iraqi insurgents. As Task Force Bayonet, the brigade included the: 503rd Infantry; 1st Battalion, 508th Infantry; 173rd Combat Support Company; 74th Infantry Detachment (LRS); Battery D, 319th Field Artillery; 501st Forward Support Company; and the attached 1st Battalion, 63rd Armor of the 1st Infantry Division from Rose Barracks, Germany; 1st Battalion, 12th Infantry of the 4th Infantry Division from Fort Carson, Colorado; and Company B, 110th Military Intelligence Battalion of the 10th Mountain Division (Light Infantry) from Fort Drum, New York. The brigade served mainly in Kirkuk for the next year. During its service, the brigade was involved in what later became known as the "Hood Event", arresting Turkish special forces soldiers, believing them to be plotting attacks against local civilian officials in northern Iraq. The Turkish forces were eventually released. The brigade also participated in Operation Bayonet Lightning in 2003, capturing weapons and materials that the Department of Defense claimed were possibly for use against coalition forces. On 21 February 2004, the brigade returned to Italy for a one-year rest before a new deployment.

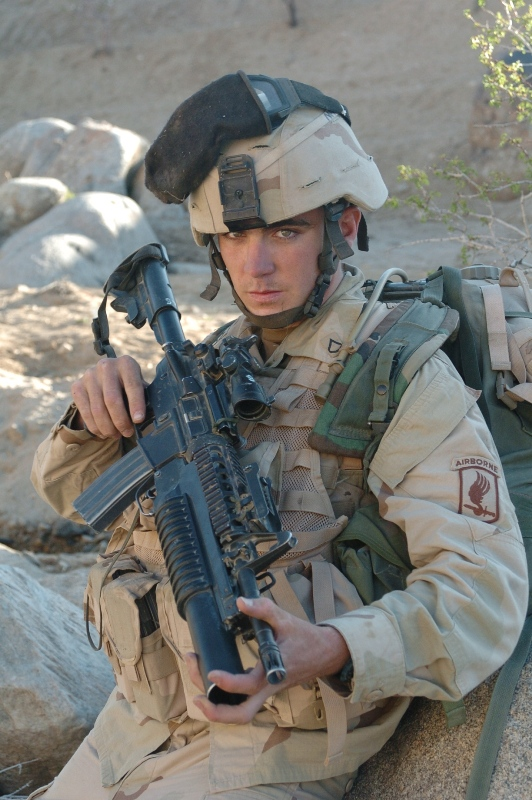
Soldier of the 173rd Airborne during Operation Enduring Freedom (2005)

=== Afghanistan, 2005–06 ===
The 173rd Airborne Brigade deployed to Afghanistan in March 2005 under the command of Colonel Kevin Owens, in support of Operation Enduring Freedom. The brigade, organized as Task Force Bayonet, assumed control of Regional Command-South (RC South).

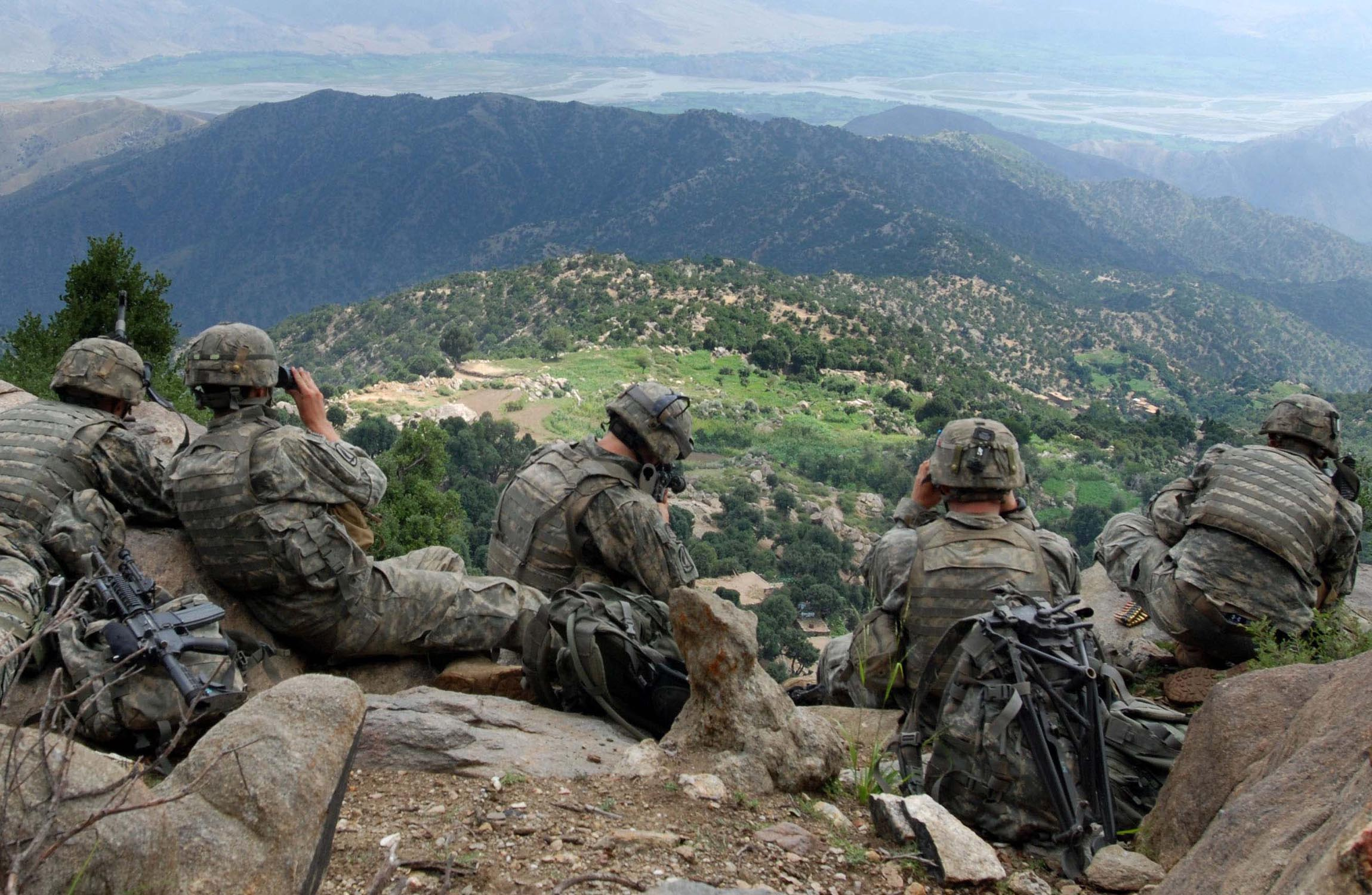
Soldiers in the Kunar Province in Afghanistan.

The 1st BN, 508th PIR (minus Company B), along with 4th Platoon, D Battery 319th Airborne Field Artillery Regiment (AFAR), conducted combat operations in eastern Afghanistan, attached to 1st Brigade, 82nd Airborne Division. D Battery 319th Airborne Field Artillery Regiment (AFAR) was deployed with a HQ Platoon, and 4 separate firing Platoons, located at FOB Shkin, FOB Lawara (Camp Tillman), Camp Blessing and FOB Orgun-E-Kalat and later FOB Bermal. The 2-503rd conducted combat operations in Zabul Province. The 3rd Battalion, 319th Airborne Field Artillery Regiment (AFAR) (3-319th) of the 82nd Airborne Division, was attached to the brigade and organized as a maneuver task force (Task Force Gun Devil). It conducted combat operations in Kandahar Province. Task Force Gun Devil included Headquarters and Service Battery, 3-319th (including two provisional maneuver platoons); Company D, 2–504th; Company B, 1–508th; Company A, 1-325th; a military police platoon (4th PLT 13th MP Co.); a rotating Romanian mechanized infantry battalion; a Canadian dismounted infantry company (3rd Bn Princess Patricia's Canadian Light Infantry); and an Afghan National Army company advised by French special forces. The 173rd Support Battalion and the 173rd Combat Support Company provided logistical support from Kandahar, while sending individual soldiers to assist at other forward operating bases.

One of the most notable units to operate out of a FOB was the brigade's 74th Long-Range Surveillance (LRS) detachment. 74th LRS operated out of FOB Price near the town of Gereshk in the Helmand Province. LRS provided the 173rd Brigade command group with key recon and intel of the province, and held control of Helmand with a 5th Special Forces Group ODA element. Assisting the LRS and 5th Group ODA were elements of the 82nd Airborne, Iowa National Guard, and ANA. The LRS detachment and 5th Group ODA conducted many combined and individual operations to ensure the stability of the region. The LRS detachment was also tasked at times for recon and intel gathering for other brigade assets, and target acquisition and designation for U.S. Air Force, U.S. Army, and RAF aircraft. The brigade returned to Italy in March 2006. Seventeen soldiers from the brigade died during this deployment.

=== Transformation ===
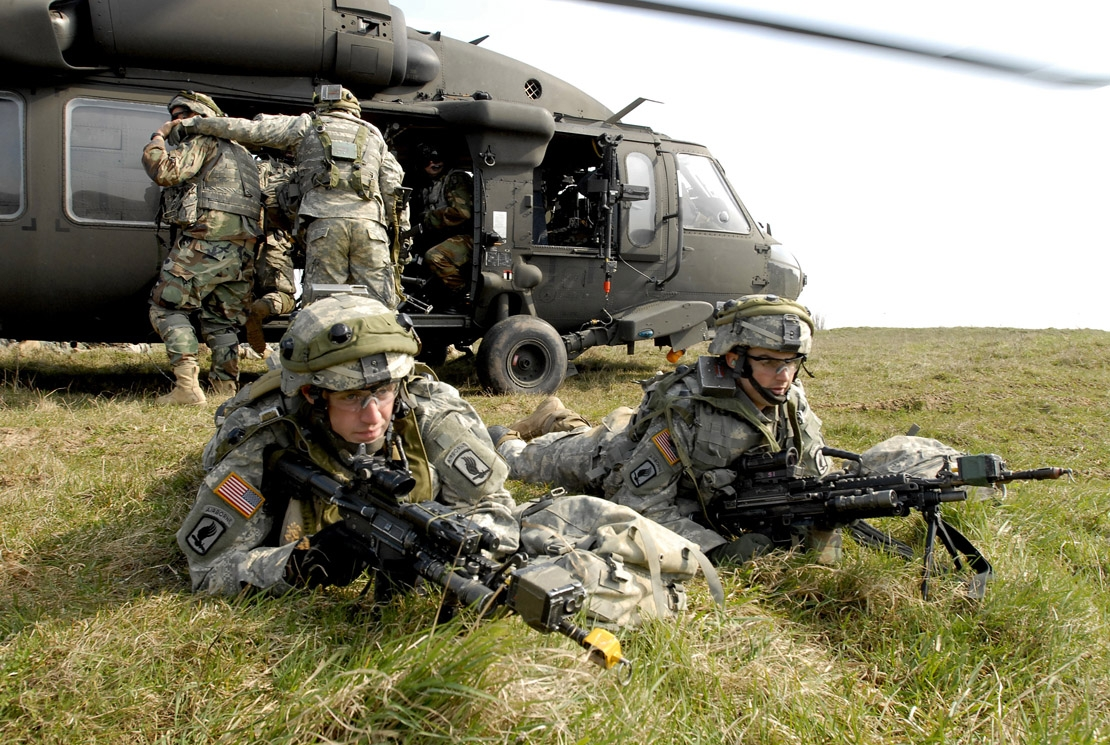
173rd Soldiers conduct air assault training in Germany (2007)

On 11 October 2006, as part of the Army's "Unit of Action" modularized unit force restructuring that General Shinseki had originally envisioned the 173rd Airborne Brigade became the 173rd Airborne Brigade Combat Team (an airborne IBCT). This was a significant change as it signified the ability for the brigade to deploy its forces and sustain itself with its newly integrated support teams. By integrating these support elements, the unit became able to maintain its fighting forces with all that is required to keep the ground soldiers supplied and moving. The infantry battalions and the brigade headquarters remained in Vicenza, Italy through the transition. Four additional battalions were activated or designated at Bamberg and Schweinfurt, Germany. These battalions were: the 4th Battalion (Airborne), 319th Field Artillery Regiment (Formally D Battery 319th Airborne Field Artillery Regiment (AFAR), the 173rd Brigade Support Battalion (Airborne), and the Special Troops Battalion stationed at Warner Barracks in Bamberg, Germany, as well as the 1st Squadron (Airborne), 91st Cavalry Regiment, stationed in Schweinfurt, Germany. After the new units were integrated into the brigade, the preponderance of the forces within the brigade were stationed in Germany, apart from the brigade headquarters in Italy. This dynamic was intended to last only until additional facilities were constructed at the Dal Molin, now Del Din, airbase near Caserma Ederle at Vicenza. The 1st Battalion (Airborne), 508th Infantry was reflagged as 1st Battalion (Airborne), 503rd Infantry Regiment to resume the Vietnam-era lineage of the 503rd Infantry battalions under the 173rd IBCT(A). The 1st Battalion, 508th Infantry colors were moved to Ft. Bragg, North Carolina to serve under the 82nd Airborne Division. Immediately after its transformation, the brigade began intensive training in both Germany and Italy to prepare itself for future deployments.

=== Afghanistan, 2007–08 ===
In 2006, the brigade was notified for a second tour of duty in Iraq from 2007 to 2008, but its deployment plan was changed to Afghanistan in February 2007 when the Pentagon announced that it would relieve the 3rd Brigade Combat Team, 10th Mountain Division along with the 4th Brigade Combat Team, 82nd Airborne Division. In the early 2007, the 173rd again deployed to Afghanistan, as Task Force Bayonet, in support of Operation Enduring Freedom (OEF 07–09), their first deployment as a fully transformed brigade combat team. The brigade was dispersed throughout the east of the country, with units operating in Kunar, Paktika, and Laghman Provinces. The 173rd IBCT(A) officially relieved the 3rd Brigade Combat Team, 10th Mountain Division on 6 June 2007.

The 173rd participated in various operations with the objective of ensuring security and subduing Taliban insurgents in the mountainous regions along Afghanistan's border with Pakistan, near the Hindu Kush. Throughout their 15-month deployment, the brigade participated in more than 9,000 patrols throughout the region. Journalist Sebastian Junger and photographer Tim Hetherington were embedded with Battle Company of 2nd Battalion which saw extensive action in the Korengal Valley. Junger later wrote a highly acclaimed book, War, and, with Hetherington, produced the award-winning documentary, Restrepo, about the deployment. Only two weeks before the brigade was to return to Europe, a platoon of 45 soldiers from the brigade stationed in the Dara-I-Pech district was attacked by a large force of insurgents during the Battle of Wanat. Though the platoon was able to drive the insurgents back with air support, the fight resulted in 9 soldiers killed and 16 wounded; the deadliest attack on troops in the country since 2005. The brigade repositioned the base three days later. The 173rd's tour ended in July 2008, and the last redeploying paratrooper from the brigade returned to Europe by the beginning of August 2008. 42 soldiers from the brigade lost their lives during the deployment. The brigade returned to Europe and home station after once again proving itself in combat throughout the eastern mountains of Afghanistan.

On 14 June 2009, the 173rd IBCT(A) was announced as one of the brigade combat teams deploying to Afghanistan, and the unit prepared to once again return.

=== Afghanistan, 2009–10 ===
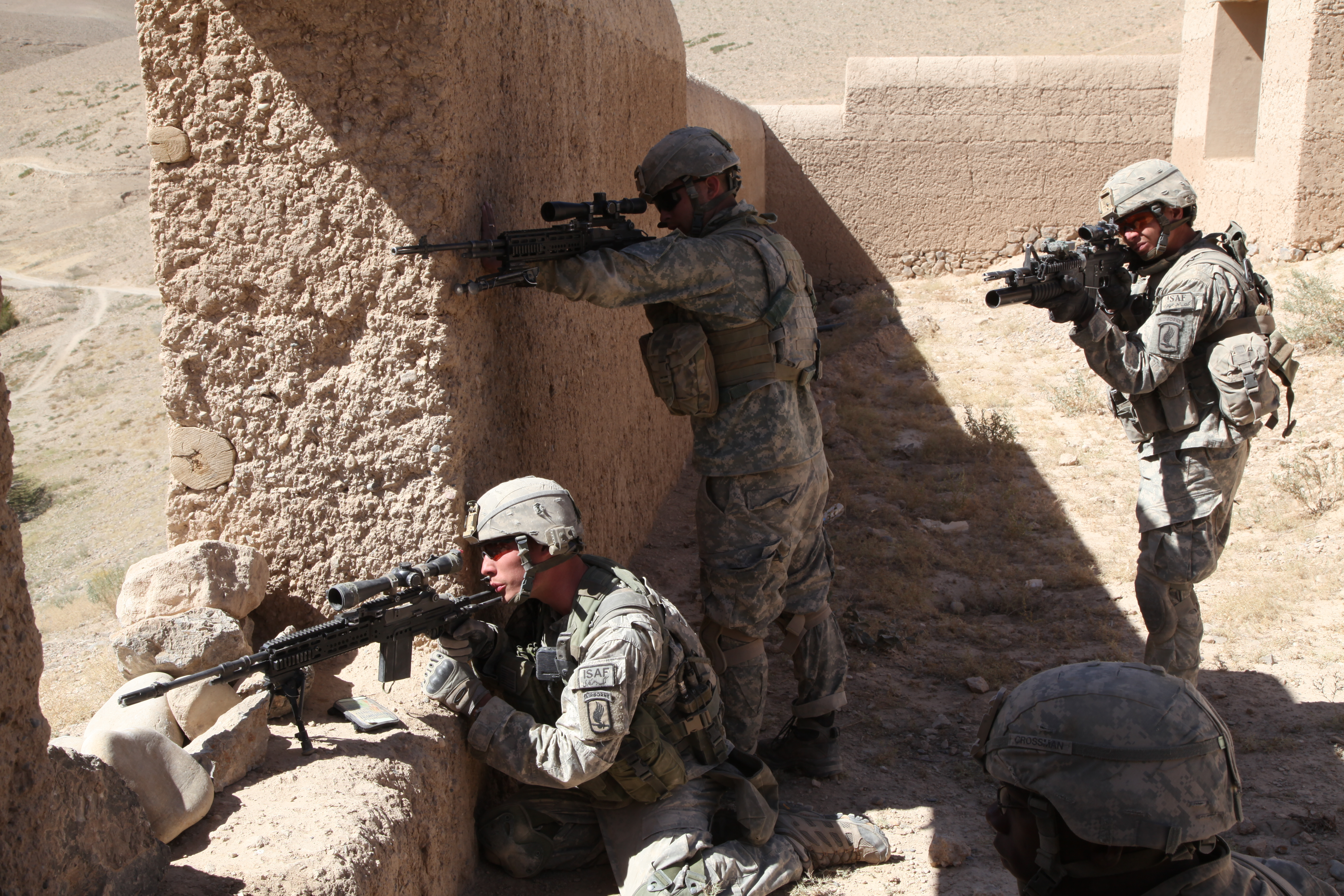
173rd IBCT(A) paratroopers in Afghanistan

From November 2009 until November 2010, the 173rd IBCT(A) once again returned to Afghanistan, this time to the provinces of Logar and Wardak. With combat experience already earned in other similar mountain regions in 2007 and 2008, the Brigade distinguished itself in combat regularly against the Taliban and fought tenaciously against them, while still promoting and attempting to legitimize the Afghan government. 2nd Battalion was initially attached to 4th Brigade, 4th Infantry Division and conducted stability and combat operations in Kunar Province for the first half of the deployment. In May 2010 2nd Battalion returned to 173rd IBCT(A) and was responsible for security and stability in northern and western Wardak Provinces. The 1st and 2nd Battalions saw extensive action in eastern Logar and Wardak. The 1/91st Cavalry was given a mission to transform western Logar province into a secure environment; a mission that was not greeted as an easy task. Given the province and its three major districts saw a massive influx of both foreign and domestic fighters due to the relatively calm winter prior to the brigade's arrival, its company-sized and platoon-sized elements found themselves in combat against anti-Coalition forces almost daily from the start of March 2010 until its relief. The brigade returned to its home station in Europe in November 2010. Seven soldiers from the brigade lost their lives during the deployment.

=== Afghanistan, 2012–13 ===
In July 2012, the 173rd IBCT(A) once again deployed to Afghanistan as part of Task Force Bayonet to relieve the 3rd Brigade Combat Team, 1st Armored Division, Task Force Bulldog in the Logar and Wardak Provinces. This was the brigade's fifth deployment since 2003, their fourth to Afghanistan as they prepare for a complete transition of the security of Afghanistan to the Afghan National Security Forces. The brigade returned in early 2013. Nine soldiers from the brigade lost their lives during the deployment.

In mid-2013, some of the returning forces reorganized and re-designated the 173rd Airborne Brigade. The reorganized brigade consolidated at a single location in Vicenza, Italy. A second base was opened in Vicenza called Del Din and is the current headquarters of the 173rd. Del Din hosts 173rd Brigade Headquarters, 2nd Battalion, 503rd Infantry Regiment, the Brigade Support Battalion, and the Brigade Special Troops Battalion. The unit did this to cover some of the spaces in Southern Europe that have opened up with the withdraw of other American forces from the area. Also in mid-2013, 1st Squadron, 91st Cavalry Regiment (ABN) moved from Schweinfurt, Germany to Grafenwoehr, Germany.

=== Operation Atlantic Resolve ===
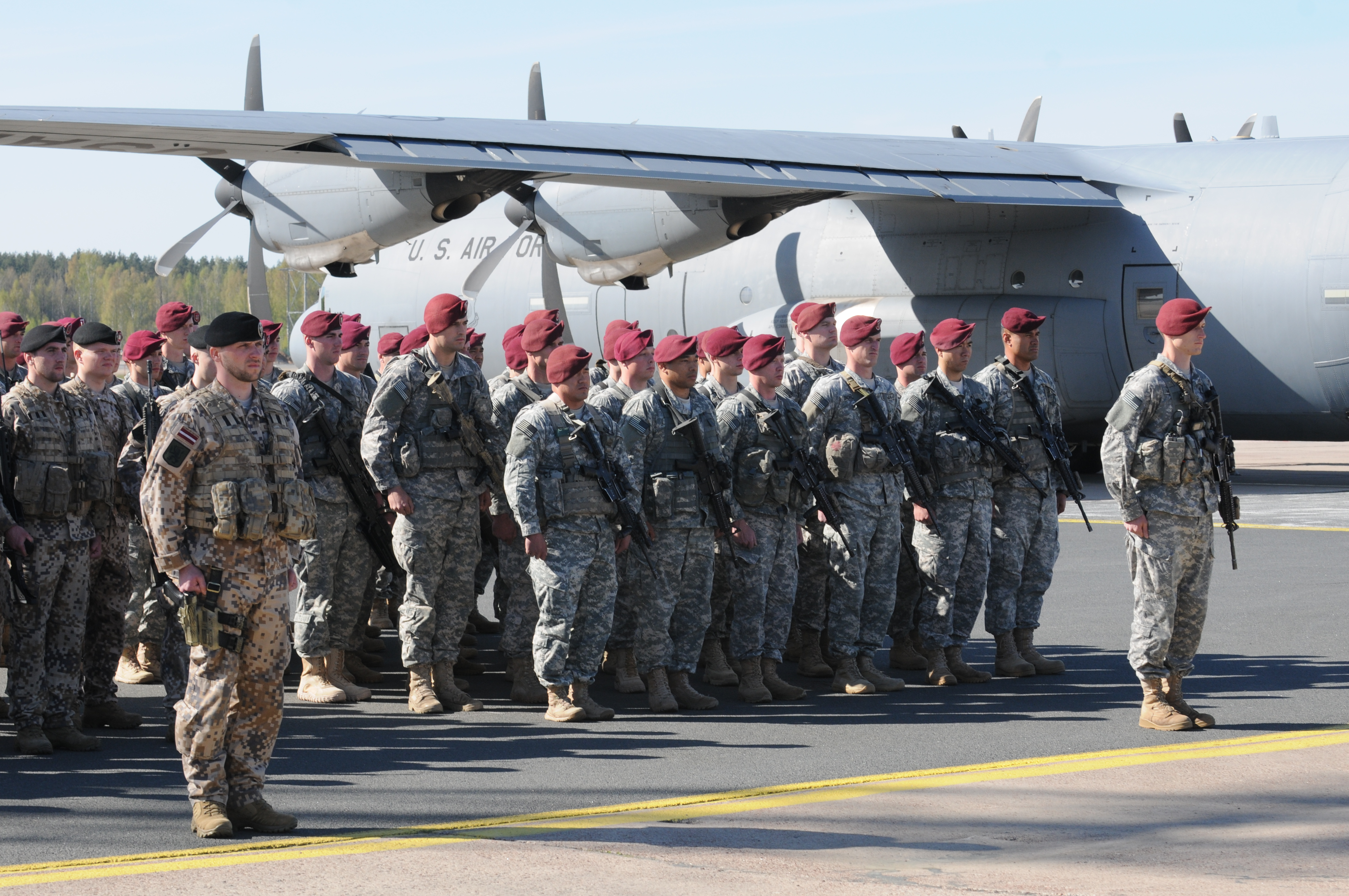
A company from 173rd IBCT arrives in Riga, Latvia in April 2014

On 23 April 2014, four paratrooper companies of the 173rd were deployed to Poland, Estonia, Latvia and Lithuania to reassure America's NATO allies threatened by Russian military maneuvers along the borders of eastern Ukraine during the 2014–15 Russian military intervention in Ukraine.

In September 2014, about 200 soldiers of 2nd Battalion, 503rd Airborne Regiment, 173rd BDE participated in the Rapid Trident exercise near Lviv in western Ukraine.

In February 2015, 750 soldiers from the brigade and from units of the Hungarian Armed Forces, namely 24th Bornemissza Gergely Reconnaissance Battalion, 34th Bercsényi László Special Operations Battalion, and the 25/88th Light Mixed Battalion participated in the exercise "Warlord Rock 2015". The goal of the activity was to exercise the combat, combat support and combat service units of both armies and to achieve a higher cooperation level in airborne operations planning, organization and management tasks.

This program was known as Fearless Guardian which was congressionally approved under the Global Contingency Security Fund. Under the program, the United States trained three battalions of Ukrainian troops over a six-month period.

In 2017, some 600 personnel (1st Squadron, 91st Cavalry Regiment) were deployed to the Baltic countries to be positioned in Estonia, Lithuania and Latvia for six weeks to coincide with the duration of the joint Russian/Belarusian strategic Zapad 2017 exercise that began 14 September 2017.

In November 2017, 2-503rd Infantry Regiment (The Rock) traveled in US Air Force C-130s to Belgrade, Serbia to conduct training with the Serbian Airborne Forces where they conducted two combined jumps at drop zones near Belgrade.

=== Planned ambush uncovered ===
A paratrooper assigned to the 1st Battalion, 503rd Infantry Regiment, in Vicenza, Italy, in 2019 through 2020 plotted an ambush on his unit, "to result in the deaths of as many of his fellow service members as possible." He was charged in June 2020 with conspiring and attempting to murder military service members, and providing and attempting to provide material support to terrorists. The paratrooper was charged with leaking classified information (including the unit's location) to the RapeWaffen Division and the Order of the Nine Angles (O9A), a European Satanic occult-based neo-Nazi and white supremacist group that is also anti-Semitic, and has expressed admiration for Nazis such as Adolf Hitler and Islamic jihadists. He faces a maximum sentence of life in prison.

=== NATO Training exercise incident in Bulgaria ===
In May 2021, as part of the NATO training exercise Swift Response 2021, soldiers of the brigade were simulating seizing and securing the decommissioned Cheshnegirovo airfield in Bulgaria. During this operation multiple buildings belonging to the airfield were secured. Soldiers accidentally entered and secured a sunflower oil factory next to the airfield while it was operating. No weapons were discharged. The army apologized and promised to improve their procedures for defining training areas.

== Honors ==
=== Unit decorations ===
Ribbon	Award	Year	Notes
	Presidential Unit Citation (Army)	1967	for fighting in the Battle of Dak To
	Meritorious Unit Commendation (Army)	1965–67	for service in Vietnam
	Republic of Vietnam Cross of Gallantry with Palm	1965–70	for service in Vietnam
	Republic of Vietnam Civil Action Honor Medal, First Class	1969–71	for service in Vietnam
	Meritorious Unit Commendation (Army)	2003–04	for service in Iraq
	Meritorious Unit Commendation (Army)	2009–10	for service in Afghanistan

=== Campaign streamers ===
Conflict	Streamer	Year(s)
World War I	(no inscription)	1918
World War II	Rhineland Campaign	1944–1945
World War II	Ardennes-Alsace Campaign	1944–1945
World War II	Central Europe Campaign	1945
Vietnam War	Vietnam Defense	1965
Vietnam War	Counteroffensive, Phase I	1965–1966
Vietnam War	Counteroffensive, Phase II	1966–1967
Vietnam War	Counteroffensive, Phase III	1967–1968
Vietnam War	Tet Counteroffensive	1968
Vietnam War	Counteroffensive, Phase IV	1968
Vietnam War	Counteroffensive, Phase V	1968
Vietnam War	Counteroffensive, Phase VI	1968–1969
Vietnam War	Tet 69/Counteroffensive	1969
Vietnam War	Summer–Fall 1969	1969
Vietnam War	Winter–Spring 1970	1970
Vietnam War	Sanctuary Counteroffensive	1970
Vietnam War	Counteroffensive, Phase VII	1970–1971
Vietnam War	Consolidation I	1970
Iraq War	Liberation of Iraq 19 March 2003 to 1 May 2003	2003–2004
Iraq War	Transition of Iraq - 2 May 2003 to 28 June 2004	2003–2004
Afghanistan War	Consolidation I - 1 Dec. 2001 to 30 Sept. 2006	2005–2006
Afghanistan War	Consolidation II 1 October 2006 – 30 November 2009	2007–2008
Afghanistan War	Consolidation III 1 December 2009 – 30 June 2011	2009–2010
Afghanistan War	Transition I 1 July 2011 – 31 December 2014	2012–2013

== Legacy ==
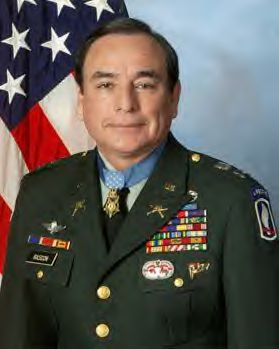
Then-Captain Alfred Rascon, a Medal of Honor recipient from the 173rd Airborne Brigade

The 173rd's service, particularly in Vietnam, has been featured several times in popular culture. The most prominent of these is the 2006 single released by the country music duo Big & Rich, entitled "8th of November". The song was based on the story of Niles Harris, a member of the 173rd, during Operation Hump. On 1 July 2006, a documentary inspired by the song and based on the brigade's actions during the operation premiered on the GAC Channel.

Illinois Route 173, which runs for 66 miles along the Illinois/Wisconsin border was designated the "173rd Airborne Brigade Highway" in 2008.

Captain Willard, a fictional character portrayed by Martin Sheen in the 1979 film Apocalypse Now, was a member of the 173rd assigned to Military Assistance Command, Vietnam – Studies and Observations Group. He was depicted as being in "the 505th battalion", although no such unit was ever part of the 173rd. Throughout the movie, he wears the Vietnam-era, mustard yellow, "subdued" shoulder sleeve insignia worn by 173rd paratroopers on their jungle fatigues during the Vietnam War. In the 1987 movie Lethal Weapon, the patch worn by Danny Glover's fictional character Roger Murtaugh during a retrospective of his time in Vietnam was that of the 173rd Airborne Brigade. In the 1998 movie The Siege, fictional Major General William Devereaux, played by Bruce Willis, states that he was in the 173rd Airborne Brigade at the same time that character Anthony Hubbard was in the 82nd Airborne Division.

Numerous servicemen from the 173rd, mostly from the Vietnam era, gained notability after their military careers ended. These include Congressmen Duncan Hunter and Charlie Norwood, Archbishop of Baltimore Edwin Frederick O'Brien, Deputy Secretary of the Treasury Robert M. Kimmitt, business owner Barney Visser, activists Stan Goff and Ted Sampley, and Sergeant Major of the Army Gene C. McKinney.

Sixteen soldiers have been awarded the Medal of Honor for service with the 173rd IBCT(A) and its subordinate units. Lloyd G. McCarter and Ray E. Eubanks earned the medal while fighting with the 503rd Infantry in World War II, while 13 other soldiers earned medals fighting under the 173rd in Vietnam; John A. Barnes III, Michael R. Blanchfield, Glenn H. English Jr., Lawrence Joel, Terry T. Kawamura, Carlos J. Lozada, Don L. Michael, Charles B. Morris, Milton L. Olive III, Larry S. Pierce, Laszlo Rabel, Alfred Rascon, and Charles J. Watters.

Staff Sergeant Salvatore Giunta received the Medal of Honor for heroic actions as a rifle team leader in Company B, 2–503 INF (Airborne) when his squad was caught in a near-ambush the night of 25 October 2007 during Operation Rock Avalanche in the Korengal Valley of Afghanistan. He was the first living Medal of Honor recipient since the Vietnam War. On 13 May 2014, former 503rd Infantry Regiment Sergeant Kyle White received the Medal of Honor during a White House ceremony.

== Sources ==
- Borch, Frederic R. (2004). Judge Advocates In Vietnam: Army Lawyers in Southeast Asia, 1959–1975. University Press of the Pacific. ISBN 978-1-4102-1772-1.
- Degen, E. J.; Gregory Fontenot, David Tohn (2007). On Point: The United States Army in Operation Iraqi Freedom. Combat Studies Institute Press. ISBN 978-0-16-078196-4.
- "US Sending Around 600 Paratroopers to Ukraine to Train Troops". Fox News. Associated Press. 4 May 2016 [11 February 2015].
- Ham, Paul (2007). Vietnam: The Australian War. Harper Collins. ISBN 978-0-7322-8237-0.
- McGrath, John J. (2004). The Brigade: A History: Its Organization and Employment in the US Army. Combat Studies Institute Press. ISBN 978-1-4404-4915-4.
- Murphy, Edward F. (2007). Dak To: America's Sky Soldiers in South Vietnam's Central Highlands. New York: Ballantine Books. ISBN 9780891419105. OCLC 159933550.
- Stanton, Shelby L. (1985). The Rise and Fall of an American Army: U.S. Ground Forces in Vietnam, 1965–1973. New York: Dell. ISBN 9780440200314. OCLC 1020242666.
- Tucker, Spencer C. (2000). Encyclopedia of the Vietnam War. ABC-CLIO. ISBN 1-57607-402-1.
- Wilson, John B. (2001). Maneuver and Firepower: The Evolution of Divisions and Separate Brigades. University Press of the Pacific. ISBN 978-0-89875-498-8.
