= Laszlo Rabel =

US Army Medal of Honor recipient (1937–1968)

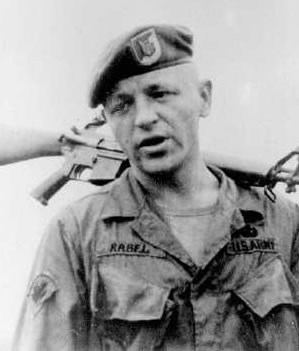
- Born: László Rábel; September 21, 1937; Budapest, Hungary
- Died: November 13, 1968 (aged 31); Binh Dinh Province, Republic of Vietnam
- Burial place: Arlington National Cemetery
- Military career
- Allegiance: United States
- Branch: United States Army
- Service years: 1965–1968
- Rank: Staff Sergeant
- Unit: 173rd Airborne Brigade
- Conflicts: Vietnam War †
- Awards: Medal of Honor; Bronze Star; Purple Heart (2)

Laszlo Rabel (born László Rábel; September 21, 1937 – November 13, 1968) was a United States Army soldier and a recipient of the United States military's highest decoration—the Medal of Honor—for his actions in the Vietnam War.

== Biography ==
Rábel fled Hungary following the 1956 revolution through Austria, and later immigrated to the United States, and settled down in Minneapolis, Minnesota. He married a Hungarian woman called Éva Rostás in 1957, who also fled Hungary after the failed 1956 revolution. They had a daughter Eve Rábel.

He joined the United States Army on November 16, 1965, In 1966 after basic training at Fort Leonard Wood he received orders to begin Advanced Infantry Training at Fort Gordon, Georgia. In the same year he volunteered to Parachute Jump School at Fort Benning. He was promoted there to Private First Class. After receiving his Parachute Jump Wings he started his career with the 101st Airborne Division's A Company, 2nd Battalion 501st Infantry Regiment. After short service with the division he was transferred to the 173rd Airborne Brigade's A Company, 4th Battalion 503rd Infantry Regiment. The unit was dispatched to Vietnam during the same year and László started his first tour of duty.

In 1967 he graduated from Recondo school and was promoted to Sergeant.

On November 13, 1968, László was serving as a staff sergeant in the 74th Infantry Detachment (Long Range Patrol), 173rd Airborne Brigade. On that day, in Binh Dinh Province, South Vietnam, he smothered the blast of an enemy-thrown hand grenade with his body, protecting his fellow soldiers at the expense of his own life.

Rábel, aged 31 at his death, was buried in Arlington National Cemetery, Arlington County, Virginia.

After a lengthy procedure, László Rábel received the Medal of Honor posthumously from President Richard Nixon on April 7, 1970. The medal was presented to his spouse Éva and daughter Eve during a ceremony in the White House.

In 1992 besides he never attended Ranger School, he was inducted to the Ranger Hall of Fame.

== Awards ==
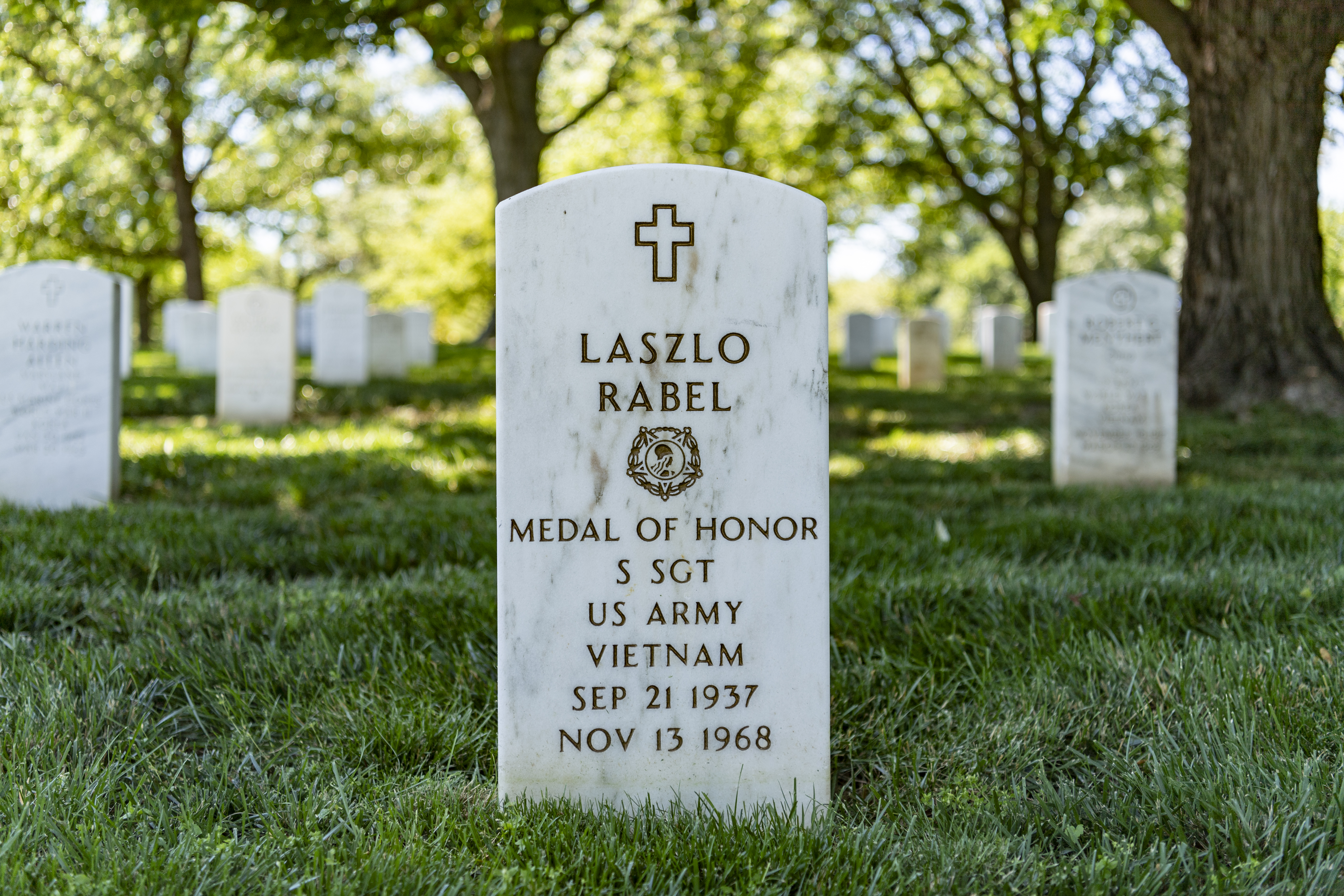
Grave at Arlington National Cemetery

- Medal of Honor
- Bronze Star Medal
- Purple Heart with oak leaf cluster
- Good Conduct Medal
- National Defense Service Medal
- Vietnam Service Medal
- Republic of Vietnam Campaign Medal

=== Medal of Honor citation ===
Staff Sergeant Rabel's official Medal of Honor citation reads:

For conspicuous gallantry and intrepidity in action at the risk of his life above and beyond the call of duty. S/Sgt. Rabel distinguished himself while serving as leader of Team Delta, 74th Infantry Detachment. At 1000 hours on this date, Team Delta was in a defensive perimeter conducting reconnaissance of enemy trail networks when a member of the team detected enemy movement to the front. As S/Sgt. Rabel and a comrade prepared to clear the area, he heard an incoming grenade as it landed in the midst of the team's perimeter. With complete disregard for his life, S/Sgt. Rabel threw himself on the grenade and, covering it with his body, received the complete impact of the immediate explosion. Through his indomitable courage, complete disregard for his safety and profound concern for his fellow soldiers, S/Sgt. Rabel averted the loss of life and injury to the other members of Team Delta. By his gallantry at the cost of his life in the highest traditions of the military service, S/Sgt. Rabel has reflected great credit upon himself, his unit, and the U.S. Army.

== See also ==
- List of Medal of Honor recipients
- List of Medal of Honor recipients for the Vietnam War
