= War Zone D =

Region in South Vietnam which the North Vietnamese used as an infiltration point and base

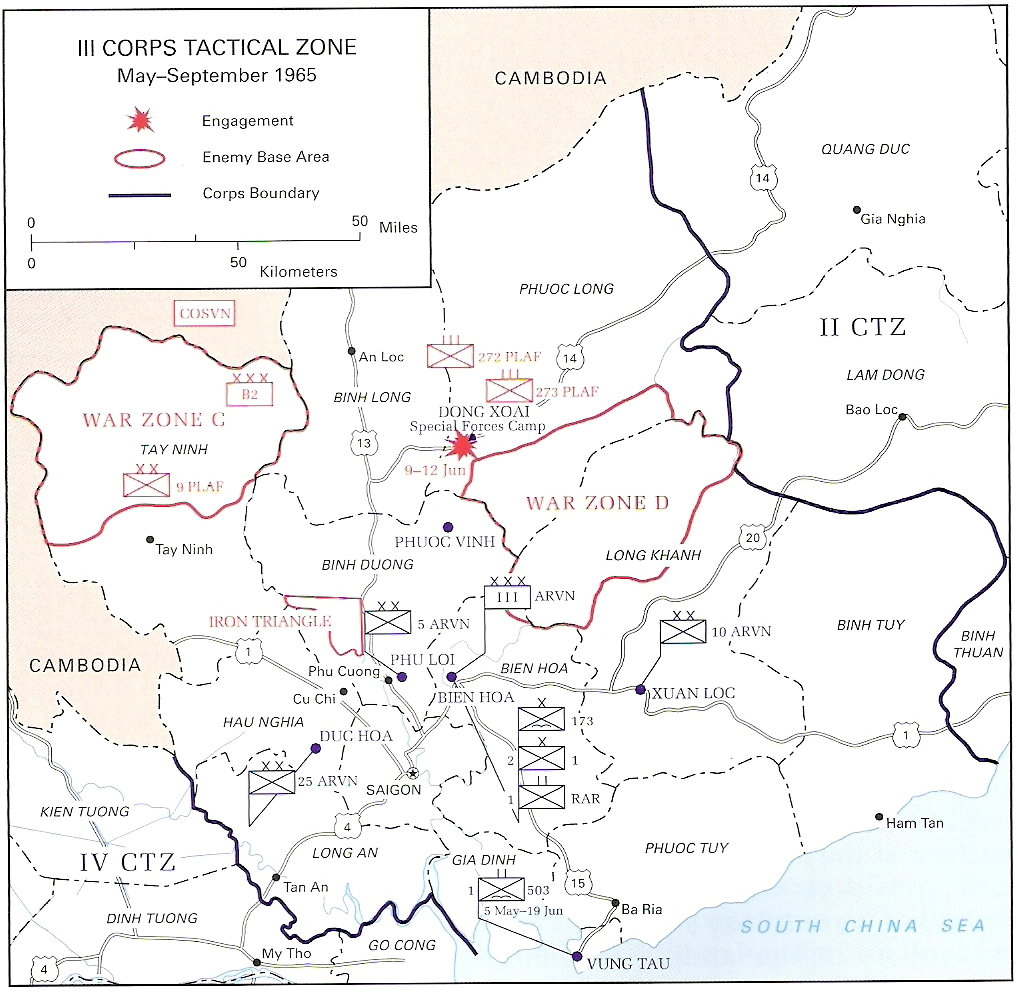
Map of III Corps including War Zone D (center)

War Zone D was the area in South Vietnam around the Dong Nai River, north of Bien Hoa which served as a Viet Cong (VC) and People's Army of Vietnam (PAVN) base area and infiltration route during the Vietnam War.

== Geography ==
War Zone D, located in the area designated as III Corps, began approximately 10km north of Bien Hoa. It comprised southern Phước Long Province, northern Long Khánh Province, northwest Bình Dương Province and northeast Biên Hòa Province. Its northern boundary was Route 14, its western boundary was Route 13 and its southern and eastern boundaries were the Dong Nai River.

Unlike some other PAVN/VC bases it was located away from the Cambodian border making it more difficult to supply and lacking the protection afforded by Cambodian neutrality.

== Actions ==
War Zone D was the target of a number of early actions by U.S. forces during the Vietnam War as they sought to extend their control out from the greater Saigon area. Shortly after their arrival in South Vietnam, the 173rd Airborne Brigade began their first combat operation on 27 June 1965 with an incursion with Army of Republic of Vietnam (ARVN) forces into War Zone D. On 7 July troops of Company A, 1st Battalion, 503rd Infantry Regiment walked into an L-shaped ambush in the zone and killed an estimated 50 VC. From 5-8 November the 173rd Airborne and 1st Battalion, Royal Australian Regiment conducted Operation Hump in the zone.

From 11 February to 2 March 1966 the U.S. 1st Infantry Division conducted Operation Rolling Stone to create a road linking Route 13 with Route 16 and isolate the zone from War Zone C to the west.

The main supply route into the zone was named the Adams Trail which began at Base Area 351 on the Cambodian side of the Phước Long Province border, tunneled its way south through a triple-canopy rainforest, skirted the eastern edge of Sông Bé Province and then passed through the western half of War Zone D. Operated by the 70th Rear Service Group, the trail terminated in northern Biên Hòa Province at a base area known to the Americans as the Catcher's Mitt (11.121°N 106.831°E).

From 4 December 1967 to 17 February 1968 the U.S. 199th Infantry Brigade conducted Operation Manchester to interdict PAVN/VC supply routes into the zone and keep the PAVN/VC away from Tân Uyên town and the Đồng Nai river hamlets and prevent rocket attacks on Long Binh Post and Bien Hoa Air Base.

A multi-division operation was planned against the zone in 1968, but following the Tet Offensive this was deferred in favor of Operation Quyet Thang. Operation Toan Thang I and its subsequent operations eventually expanded to cover most of III Corps including the zone.
