= Operation Washington Green =

Part of the Vietnam War (1969–1971)

- Part of the Vietnam War
Date	15 April 1969 – 1 January 1971
Location	Bình Định Province, South Vietnam
Result	US operational success

Belligerents
United States; South Vietnam	North Vietnam; Viet Cong

Commanders and leaders
John W. Barnes; H.S. Cunningham; Elmer R. Ochs	

Units involved
(United States) 173rd Airborne Brigade; 3rd Battalion, 506th Infantry Regiment (South Vietnam) 2nd Division; 22nd Division; Regional Force; Popular Force	3rd Division

Casualties and losses
227 killed	US body count: 1,957 killed

Operation Washington Green was a security and pacification operation during the Vietnam War conducted by the 173rd Airborne Brigade in Bình Định Province from 15 April 1969 to 1 January 1971.

== Background ==
On 15 April 1969 the 173rd Airborne Brigade assumed a new task in the four northern districts of Bình Định Province with the mission of conducting operations in support of South Vietnamese Government pacification. In the "Three Front Concept" to be performed simultaneously and included the pursuit of province and district pacification plans, the upgrading of the training, leadership, and combat effectiveness of all South Vietnamese forces operating in the area of operations, and finally the conduct of combat operations that would complement, exploit, and further stabilize South Vietnamese agencies operating in support of pacification. During the operation each maneuver battalion located its main or forward tactical operations center with that of the MACV Advisory element and the South Vietnamese Government officials at district headquarters. This placed the battalion intelligence officers in close coordination with the District Intelligence Coordination Center. Artillery liaison teams were similarly collocated with the District Fire Direction Centers. This process of collocation was maintained through all lower levels of command, such that US rifle companies collocated with Regional Force (RF) companies and rifle platoons with Popular Force (PF) platoons.

== Operation ==
Throughout August 1969 maneuver battalions conducted extensive cordon and search operations with RF/PF forces to rid the populated areas of Viet Cong (VC) guerrilla forces. Simultaneously, the units began conducting active night patrolling in an attempt to eliminate infiltration and movement by the VC infrastructure. This initial phase cost the VC 438 killed, 54 captured and 152 small arms captured.

During the period 30 September through 5 October 1969 the Brigade conducted Operation Darby Trail III in the area of the I Corps and II Corps boundary. The Brigade's mission was to conduct reconnaissance operations in the An Lão Valley and to interdict the movement of the People’s Army of Vietnam (PAVN) 2nd Regiment, 3rd Division across the boundary. This was a combined operation involving 2 battalions of the Brigade, elements of the 23rd Infantry Division and Army of the Republic of Vietnam (ARVN) 4th Regiment, 2nd Division and two regimental task forces of the ARVN 22nd Division for a total of 9 battalions. The results of this operation included 55 PAVN/VC killed and 21 small arms captured.

Operation Washington Green II was a continuation of the original mission to continue support of the pacification effort in Bình Định Province and to extend the security screen for the populated areas. By employing fire teams and squads in coordination with RF/PF, the area of operation was saturated with patrols and ambushes. Initial success enabled the 3rd Battalion, 503rd Infantry Regiment to be released from pacification and to initiate combat operations in area of operations Lee. In addition, the 3rd Battalion, 506th Infantry Regiment was placed under the operational control of the Brigade on 23 December to assist the 3/503rd in conducting reconnaissance-in-force missions in the Crow's Foot area (PAVN/VC Base Area 226) (14.3°N 108.89°E) in the Kim Son Valley. PAVN/VC losses during this period were 214 killed, 11 captured and 91 weapons captured.

On 3 February 1970, in anticipation of PAVN/VC action for Tết elements of 3/506th commenced reconnaissance-in-force operations in the high ground adjacent to My Binh Hamlet, Tam Quan District (14.516°N 109.053°E). The unit found an extensive cave complex while battling the 8th Battalion and other supporting elements of the PAVN 22nd Regiment which were discovered in attack positions on Hill 474 in Tam Quan District. During the course of the battle, which lasted six weeks, artillery, tactical air, and CS gas proved ineffective in driving the PAVN from the caves, however, drops of 55 gallon drums of fougasse succeeded in forcing the PAVN out. Results of the operation were 85 PAVN/VC killed and 4 crew-served weapons captured. Operation Washington Green III was initiated on 18 February to provide more flexibility in meeting the changing situation. While the 1st and 4th Battalions continued to provide direct support to Phù Mỹ District and Tam Quan District Pacification Programs, the 2nd and 3rd Battalions provided overall security by conducting reconnaissance-in-force against PAVN/VC build-ups with an increase in the number of combined operations. Results of the operation were 938 PAVN/VC killed, 41 captured, 30 Chieu Hoi and 383 captured weapons.

On 12 March Task Force Talon deployed in reaction to a PAVN/VC build-up in Phú Yên Province. The task force was made up of elements of the 3/503rd consisting of a command group, a reinforced rifle company of six platoons, 4.2in mortar section, and three tubes of 105mm artillery. The task force returned to the Brigade on 22 April 1970. Results of the mission were 9 PAVN/VC killed and 115 detainees.

On 10 April 1970 the 2/503rd in conjunction with two task forces and an APC Company from the ARVN 22nd Division, conducted operations in the Suoi Ca Valley against forward elements of the PAVN 3rd Division. The ARVN artillery provided all direct supporting fire for the operation. Results of this operation were 29 PAVN killed and 2 captured. On 10 May 1970, ARVN forces from AO Lee were dispatched into Cambodia. This phase of the operation has included expansion of US battalion areas of operation, accelerated training of RF/PF and more active ambushing and patrolling by all forces in and around the populated areas.

== Aftermath ==
The operation concluded on 1 January 1971. PAVN/VC losses were 1,957 killed.
