= Operation Hump =

Part of the Vietnam War (1965)

- Part of the Vietnam War
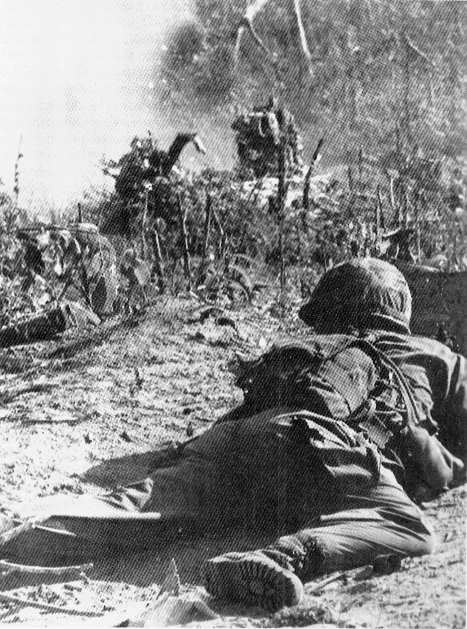
- US paratroopers under fire during Operation Hump
Date	5–8 November 1965
Location	Bắc Tân Uyên District, Đồng Nai Province, South Vietnam 11.101°N 106.948°E
Result	Allied victory

Belligerents
United States; Australia; New Zealand	Viet Cong

Commanders and leaders
(United States) Ellis W. Williamson (United States) John E. Tyler (Australia) Lou Brumfield	Trần Văn Trà

Units involved
(United States) 173rd Airborne Brigade (Australia) 1 RAR (New Zealand) 161 Bty	271st Regiment (aka Q761): 3rd Battalion; 274th Regiment: D800 Battalion

Strength
400	1,200

Casualties and losses
(United States) 49 killed (Australia) 2 missing (Found deceased).	US body count: 400–700 killed

Operation Hump was a search and destroy operation initiated by United States and Australian forces on 5 November 1965, during the Vietnam War.

The US-Australian objective was to drive out Viet Cong (VC) unit who had taken up positions on several key hills in War Zone D in an area about 17.5 miles (28.2 km) north of Bien Hoa. The U.S. 1st Battalion, 503rd Infantry Regiment (1/503rd), 173rd Airborne Brigade conducted a helicopter assault on an LZ northwest of the Dong Nai River and Song Be River. The 1st Battalion, Royal Australian Regiment (1RAR) was deployed south of the Dong Nai river. On 8 November the major engagement of the operation took place when a VC regiment attempted to encircle and overrun the 1/503rd resulting in 49 U.S. killed and between 400 and 700 VC killed. On the same day in an engagement known later as the Battle of Gang Toi, 1RAR attacked a VC bunker and trench system, killing six VC and capturing five, while losing two missing.

== Prelude ==
On 5 November, the 173rd Airborne Brigade received intelligence indicating that a VC regimental headquarters, mistakenly reported as belonging to the 272nd instead of the 271st, its three battalions, and the 274th Regiment's D800 Battalion were massed near the confluence of the Dong Nai and Song Be rivers in War Zone D. About twenty-two kilometers northeast of Bien Hoa Air Base, the area had been entered by the Americans several times before. The brigade commander Brigadier General Ellis W. Williamson, organized a force of three battalions: the 1st Battalion, 503rd Infantry, commanded by Lieutenant Colonel John E. Tyler; the 1st Battalion, Royal Australian Regiment, led by Lieutenant colonel Lou Brumfield; and the 3rd Battalion, 319th Artillery Regiment, under Lieutenant Colonel Lee E. Smut. The brigade's third maneuver element, the 2nd Battalion, 503d Infantry, commanded by Lieutenant Colonel George E. Dexter, remained in reserve at Bien Hoa. The plan required the artillery to establish a firebase near the area of operation. Once the firebase was in place, Williamson's infantry would helicopter into the countryside to see what it could find. The only requirement was that the maneuver elements remain within range of the firebase's guns.

== Operation ==
Early on the morning of 5 November the artillery battalion, accompanied by Troop E, 17th Cavalry Regiment, and Company D, 16th Armor, went into Position Ace (11.06°N 106.932°E), east of the Dong Nai and about 8 km southwest of its junction with the Song Be. 1RAR then moved by helicopter to Landing Zone Jack, also east of the Dong Nai but closer to the Song Be by about 5 km. Following an artillery preparation and tactical airstrikes, the Australian battalion was on the ground by midmorning. Shortly afterwards, helicopters delivered a battery of four 105-mm. L5 pack howitzers belonging to the 105 Field Battery, Royal Australian Artillery. Tyler's 1/503rd followed in the afternoon at Landing Zone King (11.102°N 106.955°E), about 1.5 km southwest of the Dong Nai-Song Be junction.

The two infantry battalions devoted the rest of the day to settling in and clearing fields of fire. The Australians set up very close to their landing zone, which was located near a paddyfield that stretched east and south towards small hill masses ranging up to 25m in height. The hills had many open areas but also contained jungle in some places. There the trees could reach up to 40m in height and the undergrowth was tangled thick with vines and underbrush. Observation out from the laager for about 50m was good, and cover and concealment were excellent, but fields of fire on the approach favored the VC. 1/503rd was in similar terrain north and west of the Australians.

Units from the two battalions began working outwards to the south and east of their bases on 6 and 7 November, employing company and platoon-size patrols. Except for two fleeting exchanges in which the Australians killed 3 VC, neither force found the VC main forces. Both did, however, uncover empty camps complete with supplies and equipment, bunker and tunnel complexes, and a number of booby-trapped huts. They destroyed everything they could.

On 7 November 1/503rd continued probing west of the Dong Nai, a few kilometers north of the original landing zone. Late that afternoon camp was established near the bottom of Hill 65 (11.132°N 106.93°E), an important objective to Tyler because the hill provided excellent observation and intelligence had pinpointed a VC unit about 2 km to its west. The information on the VC position seemed promising, for the message in which it was identified had included the words Sour Apples. During briefings prior to the operation Tyler and his operations officer had been instructed to keep a special watch for the phrase and to make certain that the area it signified was searched. Just before dark on the 7th Tyler sent patrols to check the area in question. What happened next remains unclear. The commander of Tyler's Company A, Captain Walter B. Daniel, recalled that when the patrols returned they had nothing to report. The chaplain accompanying the battalion, Captain James M. Hutchens, subsequently wrote that one of the patrols found fresh footprints less than 1 km from the unit's camp and also heard the "occasional muffled cackling of chickens," which VC soldiers carried for food. Whatever the troops found, VC historians would confirm later that the 271st's 3rd Battalion was in the area and that it received orders on the morning of the 8th to attack Tyler and his men. The unit commander hoped to ambush the Americans after they emerged from their encampment to sweep around the base of the hill.

=== Battle ===
At about 06:00 on 8 November C Company began a move northwest toward Hill 65, while B Company moved northeast toward Hill 78 and A Company remained at the patrol base. C Company advanced in three lines about 30m apart. As C Company moved through an open area into the jungle, they found a recently vacated hamlet. Making their way through the area with care because of possible mines and booby traps, they continued on west. Shortly before 08:00, C Company was engaged by a sizeable VC force, well entrenched some 15–30 meters away around the foot of Hill 65. Claymore mines exploded and sheets of fire from carefully positioned .30 and .50 caliber machine guns engulfed the troopers.

The VC attempted three times during the day to encircle the 1/503rd. First, they tried to envelop C Company from the right, causing Tyler to commit B Company to secure that flank at 08:45. In the fighting that followed, B Company moved into the breach from the northeast to break the envelopment often relying on fixed bayonets to repel daring close range attacks by small bands of VC fighters. B Company reached the foot of Hill 65 at about 09:30 and moved up the hill. It became obvious that there was a large VC force in place on the hill, C Company was suffering heavy casualties, and B Company was forcing the VC's right flank.

Under pressure from B Company's flanking attack, the VC shifted their position to the northwest, whereupon the B Company commander called in air and artillery fire on the retreating VC. The shells scorched the foliage and caught many VC fighters ablaze, exploding the ammunition and grenades they carried. B Company halted in place in an effort to locate and consolidate with C Company's platoons. Together they managed to establish a coherent defensive line, running around the hilltop from southeast to northwest, but with little cover on the southern side. Later in the morning, following a second unsuccessful effort, the VC attempted a wide envelopment of both Companies B and C, by then clustered in a single position. The VC commander realized that his best chance was to hug the U.S. forces so that the 173rd's air and artillery fire could not be effectively employed. VC troops attempted to out-flank the US position atop the hill from both the east and the southwest, moving his troops closer to the Americans. The result was shoulder-to-shoulder attacks up the hillside, hand-to-hand fighting, and isolation of parts of B and C Companies; the Americans held against two such attacks.

Tyler thwarted the move by committing his reserve force, A Company, but he instructed A Company's commander to avoid becoming decisively engaged because the 173rd lacked enough helicopters to bring up reinforcements quickly. With their focus on overrunning B and C Companies, the VC apparently overlooked Company A's advance through the thick underbrush with A Company coming upon them as they rushed the American position, opened fire and stopped the assault. Regrouping, the VC turned on A Company, who had to fight off three attacks in quick succession while pulling back to the east. As Company A continued its fighting withdrawal, Tyler came up on the radio to warn Daniel against leading the VC to the battalion base. The order proved unnecessary, because the VC had abandoned the pursuit.

Although the fighting continued after the second massed attack, it reduced in intensity as the VC troops again attempted to disengage and withdraw, scattering into the jungle to throw off the trail of pursuing U.S forces. By late afternoon it seemed that contact had been broken, allowing Companies B and C to prepare a night defensive position and collect their dead and wounded in the center of the position. Although a few of the most seriously wounded were extracted by USAF helicopters using Stokes litters, the triple-canopy jungle prevented the majority from being evacuated until the morning of 9 November. During the fighting, Specialist Lawrence Joel, a medic, distinguished himself tending to his wounded comrades while under heavy fire. He was subsequently awarded the Medal of Honor.

Across the Dong Nai 1RAR engaged the VC Company 238 in the Battle of Gang Toi killing six VC and capturing five in an assault on an entrenched VC position on Hill 82, while losing two missing, whose remains were only recovered 42 years later.

On 9 November the 1/503rd continued its search of the area but found no VC. After that, with the VC clearly gone and American dead and wounded attended to, there seemed little reason to stay. General Williamson terminated the operation, and the brigade returned to base.

== Aftermath ==
Official reports would later claim that the 173rd Airborne Brigade had killed about 400 VC by body count and another 200 estimated dead while U.S. casualties were 49 killed and 83 wounded. The figure of 400 turned out to be a guess, however, which Williamson made in the immediate aftermath of the battle under pressure from Military Assistance Command, Vietnam headquarters. Later appraisals would raise the count to 700, but they are suspect as well. Since the VC unit involved was the 271st's 3rd Battalion, a body count of 700 would have meant that the 1/503rd had killed twice as many VC as were present during battle.

While Williamson later observed that they had "beat the living hell " out of the VC he eventually concluded that "it was not the smartest fight. The enemy had set a trap." In the hope of destroying an American unit, "he had lured us into a battle in an area of his choosing."

== Remembrance ==
Operation Hump is memorialized in a song by Big and Rich named 8th of November. The introduction, as read by Kris Kristofferson, is:

On November 8th 1965, the 173rd Airborne Brigade on "Operation Hump", war zone "D" in Vietnam, were ambushed by over 1200 VC. Forty-eight American soldiers lost their lives that day. Severely wounded and risking his own life, Lawrence Joel, a medic, was the first living black man since the Spanish–American War to receive the United States Medal of Honor for saving so many lives in the midst of battle that day. Our friend, Niles Harris, retired 25 years United States Army, the guy who gave Big Kenny his top hat, was one of the wounded who lived. This song is his story. Caught in the action of kill or be killed, greater love hath no man than to lay down his life for his brother.

The final sentence is a reference to John 15:13 in the Christian Bible.
