= 4th Air Support Operations Squadron =

4th Air Support Operations Squadron

- A USAF Tactical Air Control Party specialist communicates with supporting aircraft during a training exercise
- Active: 1996–2013; 2021(?)–present
- Country: United States
- Branch: United States Air Force
- Role: Air Support Operations
- Part of: United States Air Forces Europe
- Nickname(s): Warhawks
- Engagements: Kosovo War; Iraq War
- Decorations: Air Force Outstanding Unit Award with Combat "V" Device; Air Force Outstanding Unit Award

Insignia
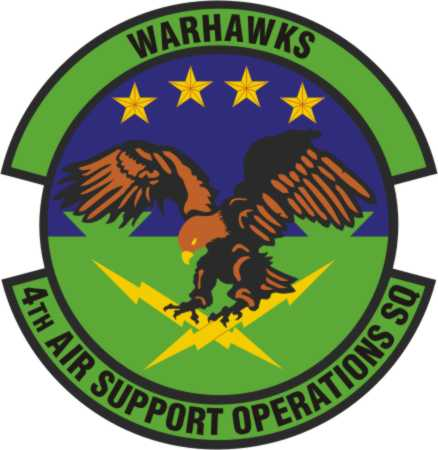
- 4th Air Support Operations Squadron emblem (approved 12 March 2004)

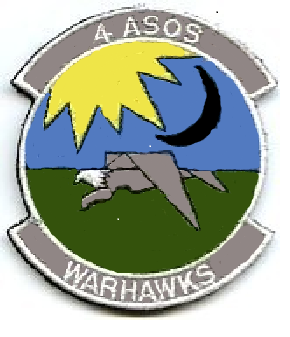
- 4th Air Support Operations Squadron (second emblem)

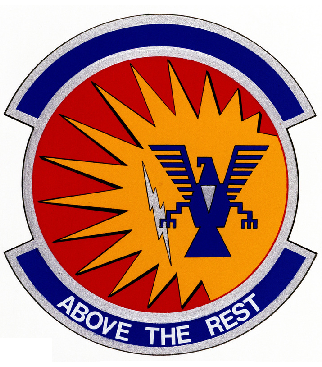
- 4th Air Support Operations Squadron emblem (early)

The United States Air Force's 4th Expeditionary Air Support Operations Squadron is a combat support unit forward deployed in Eastern Europe to locations in Poland, Lithuania and Romania where it provides Joint Terminal Attack Controllers and C2 functions for both the Army and the Air Force. It was previously located at Mannheim, Germany with V Corps until it was inactivated in 2013.

== Mission ==
The squadron provided tactical air command and control of airpower assets to the Joint Forces Air Component Commander and Joint Forces Land Component Commander for combat operations. It deployed personnel and command, control, communications, and computer (C4) systems and associated support equipment and materiel in order to establish an Air Support Operations Center) as part of the Theater Air Control System and providing airpower support to US Army V Corps.

== History ==
The squadron was established on 1 September 1996 and activated in Mannheim, Germany on 30 September of the same year. In 2013, it was inactivated. In 2021, the 4th Expeditionary Air Support Operations Squadron (4th EASOS) took part in the Castle Forge exercise, integrating with the members of the 606th Air Control Squadron and the 1st Combat Communications Squadron. The exercise took place in parts of Romania, Greece and Bulgaria.

== Lineage ==
- Constituted as the 4th Air Support Operations Squadron on 1 September 1996

Activated on 30 September 1996
Inactivated on 13 September 2013

=== Assignments ===
- 4th Air Support Operations Group, 30 September 1996 – 13 September 2013

=== Stations ===
- Sullivan Barracks, Mannheim, Germany, 30 September 1996 – 13 September 2013
