= Ellis W. Williamson =

United States Army general

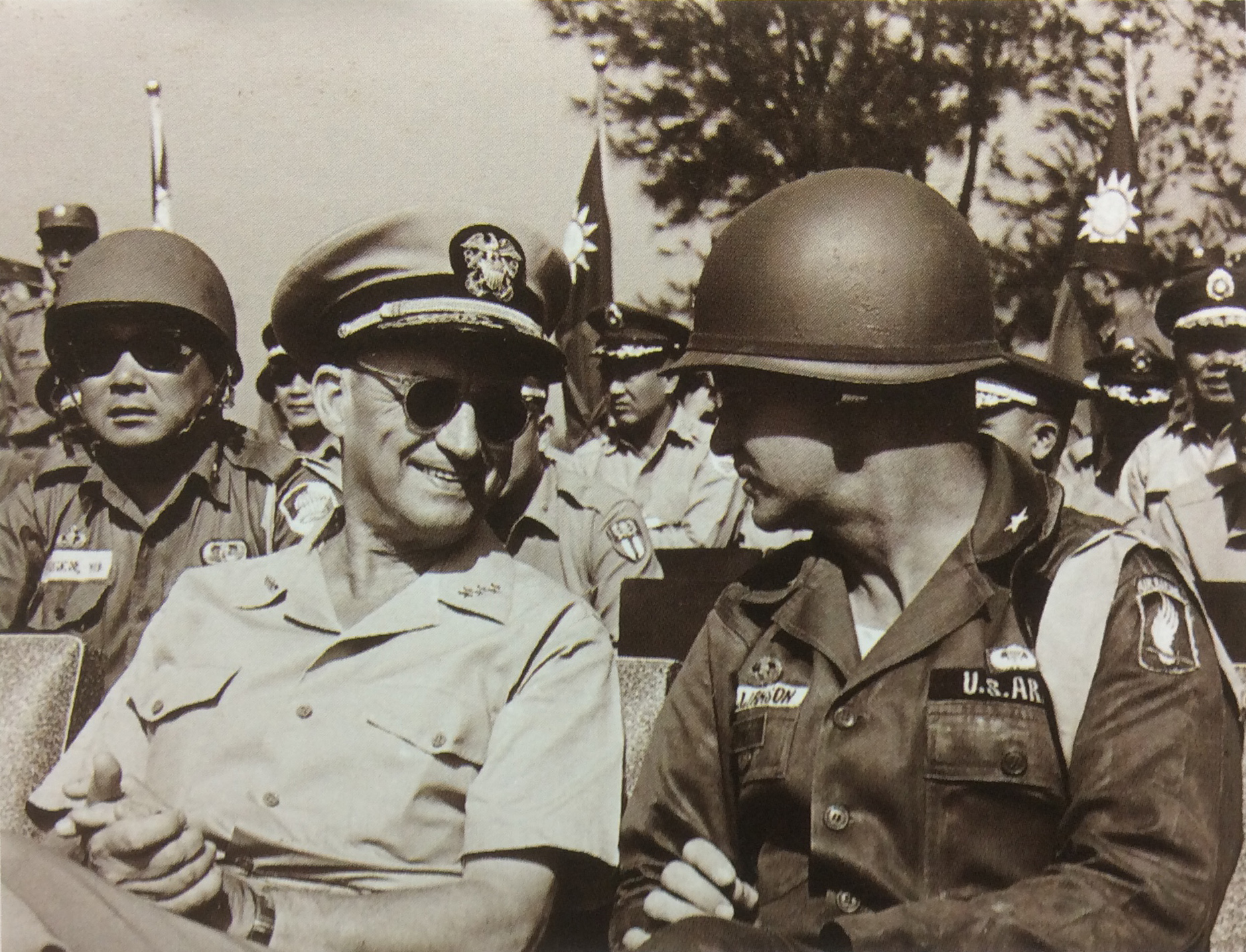
- BG Williamson (right) as the presiding officer over the Tien Bing No. 4 exercise in Taiwan, 1963
- Born: June 4, 1918; Raeford, North Carolina, U.S.
- Died: January 28, 2007 (aged 88); Arlington, Virginia
- Burial place: Arlington National Cemetery
- Military career
- Allegiance: United States of America
- Branch: United States Army
- Service years: 1940–1973
- Rank: Major General
- Nickname: Butch
- Commands: 173rd Airborne Brigade; 25th Infantry Division
- Conflicts: World War II; Korean War; Vietnam War
- Awards: Distinguished Service Cross; Distinguished Service Medal (4); Silver Star (6); Legion of Merit; Bronze Star Medal (3); Distinguished Flying Cross; Air Medal (28); Purple Heart (4); Combat Infantryman Badge; Master Parachutist Badge; Army Aviator Badge

Ellis W. Williamson (June 4, 1918 – January 28, 2007) was a United States Army Major General who served in World War II, the Korean War and the Vietnam War. He led the 173rd Airborne Brigade, the first US Army unit to deploy to South Vietnam and later commanded the 25th Infantry Division there.

== Early life and education ==
Williamson was born in Raeford, North Carolina on 4 June 1918. During high school he joined the 120th Infantry Regiment, part of the North Carolina National Guard.

Williamson graduated with a Bachelor of Arts degree from Atlantic Christian College in 1940, an MBA from Harvard Business School in 1962, and a masters degree from George Washington University.

== Career ==
=== World War II ===
Williamson was commissioned as a Second Lieutenant in March 1941 and with the US entry into World War II, the 120th Infantry was federalised and sent for overseas service.

In January 1945 Williamson, now a lieutenant colonel led the 1st Battalion of the 120th Infantry during the Battle of the Bulge.

=== Post World War II ===
Williamson graduated from the Command and General Staff College in 1950 and was assigned to the headquarters of X Corps in Korea.

=== Korean War ===
As the Assistant Operations Officer of X Corps, Williamson participated in the Inchon landings.

=== Post Korean War ===
Williamson took command of the 13th Infantry Regiment at Fort Carson, Colorado, in 1956. In 1959 he was appointed Chief of the Training Division, Headquarters, 7th U.S. Army. He then attended the National War College.

Williamson was promoted to brigadier general in 1963. On 26 March 1963, Williamson was appointed to command the newly activated 173rd Airborne Brigade (Separate) on Okinawa, which was to serve as the quick reaction force or "fire brigade" for the Pacific Command. For over 2 years Williamson trained the 173rd on Okinawa focusing on airborne techniques with an emphasis on jungle warfare, enhanced by training in the Philippines, Thailand and Taiwan.

=== Vietnam War ===
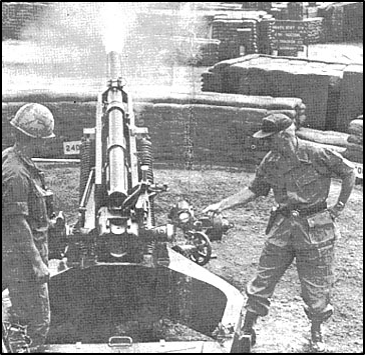
MG Ellis Williamson fires a 105mm howitzer

On 7 May 1965 Williamson led the 173rd Airborne Brigade in its deployment to South Vietnam, becoming the first major US Army ground combat unit to deploy there. The 173rd was originally assigned to protect Bien Hoa Air Base and the base area at Vung Tau. On arrival at Bien Hoa the 173rd trained in airmobile warfare using the 3 UH-1 helicopters assigned to the Brigade. In mid-May the 173rd commenced combat operations against the Viet Cong. In June Williamson assumed control of the newly arrived 1st Battalion, Royal Australian Regiment and the 161st Battery, Royal New Zealand Artillery.

From 28 June to 2 August the 173rd conducted a sweep operation near the Rung Sat Special Zone which failed to locate any Viet Cong. This operation prompted Associated Press correspondent Peter Arnett to write a story stating "There appeared to be a chain reaction of mistakes that decreed success virtually impossible even before the operation got fully underway. Many observers feel that the U.S. high command may be embarked on a strategy that brought failure to Vietnamese forces before and could bring failure to U.S. forces now." According to Arnett this story infuriated Williamson who summoned him to his headquarters for a dressing down where he reports Williamson stating that "Don't you know that the VC are cowards, they fight only at night and when we catch a bunch of them together they run away" and he urged Arnett to "get on the team" reporting positively on U.S. actions.

In October 1965, the 173rd launched Operation 25-65 in the Iron Triangle which resulted in little action. Williamson stated that "the Iron Triangle has been... for all practical purposes destroyed". He also claimed that the operation proved that American forces could "go and stay anywhere and anytime in Vietnam".

In November 1965, the 173rd launched Operation Hump at the conclusion of which the unit claimed that they had killed over 400 Vietcong, a figure which was acknowledged to be a guess by Williamson given under pressure from General Westmoreland at Military Assistance Command, Vietnam. Williamson later stated that his forces had "beat the living hell" out of the Vietcong, but acknowledged that the battle had only come about because the Vietcong had lured the Americans into a battle at a time and place of their choosing.

While Williamson was confident in the search and destroy strategy, an Australian officer expressed doubts in his approach saying that Williamson "had a dangerous contempt for the guerilla and little understanding of the Viet Cong's objectives or how he fights."

In February 1966, Williamson was appointed assistant commander of United States Army Infantry School at Fort Benning, Georgia. He was later promoted to major general and on 1 November 1966 was given command of the Advanced Infantry Training Center ("Tigerland") at Fort Polk, Louisiana.

Returning to Vietnam, on 3 August 1968 Williamson took command of the 25th Infantry Division from MG Fillmore K. Mearns, commanding the unit until 1969. On assuming command Williamson issued a standing order that the division was to return 1000 rounds for every round fired at them.

=== 1971 to 1973 ===
From 1971 to 1973, Williamson served as the Chief of the U. S. Military Mission in Iran. He retired from the Army in 1973.

== Later life ==
Williamson died on 28 January 2007 in Arlington, Virginia and was buried at Arlington National Cemetery.
