= 1st Battalion, 503rd Infantry Regiment =

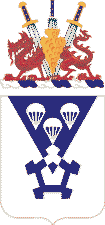
- Coat of arms
- Active: 1941–45; 1951–84; 1986–2005; 2006–present
- Country: United States
- Branch: United States Army
- Type: Infantry
- Role: Airborne
- Size: Battalion
- Part of: 173rd Airborne Brigade Combat Team
- Nickname: First Rock
- Engagements: World War II; Vietnam War; Operation Enduring Freedom; Operation Iraqi Freedom

Commanders
- Battalion Commander: LTC Travis H. Young
- Command Sergeant Major: CSM Trevor O. Petsch

Insignia
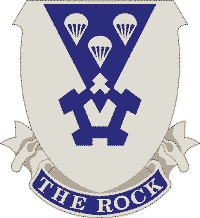
- Distinctive unit insignia

- Beret flash

The 1st Battalion, 503rd Infantry Regiment (1–503rd IR) is an active duty airborne infantry battalion in the United States Army, assigned to the 173rd Airborne Brigade Combat Team and stationed in Vicenza, Italy. The battalion has served with the 2nd Infantry Division, the 11th Airborne Division, the 24th Infantry Division, the 82nd Airborne Division, and the 173rd Airborne Brigade; has been stationed in Korea, Italy and the United States; and earned campaign credits in World War II, the Vietnam War, Operation Enduring Freedom-Afghanistan, and Operation Iraqi Freedom.

== History ==
The lineage of Company A, 503rd AIR, was reorganized and redesignated on 1 March 1957 as Headquarters and Headquarters Company, 1st Airborne Battle Group, 503rd Infantry, and remained assigned to the 11th Airborne Division (organic elements concurrently constituted and activated).

On 1 July 1958 the 1st ABG, 503rd Infantry was relieved from assignment to the 11th Airborne Division and assigned to the 24th Infantry Division when the 11th was reflagged as the 24th. The battle group's stay was short, and on 7 January 1959 it was relieved from assignment to the 24th Infantry Division and assigned to the 82nd Airborne Division.

The 1st ABG, 503rd Inf remained with the 82nd Airborne Division until 26 March 1963, when it was relieved from assignment to the 82nd and joined 2–503rd in its assignment to the 173rd Airborne Brigade. Shortly thereafter, on 25 June 1963, it was reorganized and redesignated as the 1st Battalion (Airborne), 503rd Infantry.

== Lineage and honors ==
=== Lineage ===
- Constituted 14 March 1941 in the Army of the United States as Company A, 503rd Parachute Battalion
- Activated 22 August 1941 at Fort Benning, Georgia
- Consolidated 24 February 1942 with Company A, 503rd Parachute Infantry (concurrently constituted in the Army of the United States), and consolidated unit designated as Company A, 503rd Parachute Infantry
- Inactivated 24 December 1945 at Camp Anza, California
- Redesignated 1 February 1951 as Company A, 503rd Airborne Infantry, an element of the 11th Airborne Division, and allotted to the Regular Army
- Activated 2 March 1951 at Fort Campbell, Kentucky
- Reorganized and redesignated 1 March 1957 as Headquarters and Headquarters Company, 1st Airborne Battle Group, 503rd Infantry, and remained assigned to the 11th Airborne Division (organic elements concurrently constituted and activated)
- Relieved 1 July 1958 from assignment to the 11th Airborne Division and assigned to the 24th Infantry Division
- Relieved 7 January 1959 from assignment to the 24th Infantry Division and assigned to the 82nd Airborne Division
- Relieved 26 March 1963 from assignment to the 82d Airborne Division and assigned to the 173rd Airborne Brigade
- Reorganized and redesignated 25 June 1963 as the 1st Battalion, 503rd Infantry
- Relieved 14 January 1972 from assignment to the 173rd Airborne Brigade and assigned to the 101st Airborne Division
- Inactivated 16 November 1984 at Fort Campbell, Kentucky, and relieved from assignment to the 101st Airborne Division
- Assigned 16 December 1986 to the 2nd Infantry Division and activated in Korea
- Redesignated 1 October 2005 as the 1st Battalion, 503rd Infantry Regiment
- Inactivated 15 November 2005 at Fort Carson, Colorado, and relieved from assignment to the 2nd Infantry Division
- Assigned 15 June 2006 to the 173rd Airborne Brigade and activated in Italy

(173d Airborne Brigade redesignated 16 September 2006 as the 173d Airborne Brigade Combat Team)

=== Campaign participation credit ===
- World War II: New Guinea; Leyte; Luzon (with arrowhead); Southern Philippines
- Vietnam: Defense; Counteroffensive; Counteroffensive, Phase II; Counteroffensive, Phase III; Tet Counteroffensive; Counteroffensive, Phase IV; Counteroffensive, Phase V; Counteroffensive, Phase VI; Tet 69/Counteroffensive; Summer-Fall 1969; Winter-Spring 1970; Sanctuary Counteroffensive; Counteroffensive, Phase VII
- War on Terrorism: Campaigns to be determined
  - Afghanistan: Consolidation I, Consolidation II, Consolidation III, Transition I
  - Iraq: Iraqi Governance

Note: The published Army lineage shows War on Terrorism "Campaigns to be determined". Comparison of the battalion's deployment dates with the War on Terrorism campaigns estimates that the battalion will be credited with participation in the six campaigns listed.

=== Decorations ===
- Presidential Unit Citation (Army), Streamer embroidered CORREGIDOR
- Presidential Unit Citation (Army), Streamer embroidered BIEN HOA
- Presidential Unit Citation (Army), Streamer embroidered DAK TO
- Naval Unit Commendation, Streamer embroidered IRAQ 2004–2005
- Valorous Unit Award, Streamer embroidered PAKTIKA PROVINCE 2007–2008
- Meritorious Unit Commendation (Army), Streamer embroidered VIETNAM 1965–1967
- Meritorious Unit Commendation (Army), Streamer embroidered AFGHANISTAN 2009–2010
- Philippine Presidential Unit Citation, Streamer embroidered 17 OCTOBER 1944 TO 4 JULY 1945
- Republic of Vietnam Cross of Gallantry with Palm, Streamer embroidered VIETNAM 1965–1970
- Republic of Vietnam Civil Action Honor Medal, First Class, Streamer embroidered VIETNAM 1969–1971

Company B additionally entitled to:

- Meritorious Unit Commendation (Army), Streamer embroidered AFGHANISTAN MAY 2007-JUL 2008

== Heraldry ==
=== Distinctive unit insignia ===
503rd Infantry Distinctive Unit Insignia

=== Coat of arms ===
503rd Infantry Coat of Arms
