= Mace of the Virginia House of Delegates =

Token of government authority

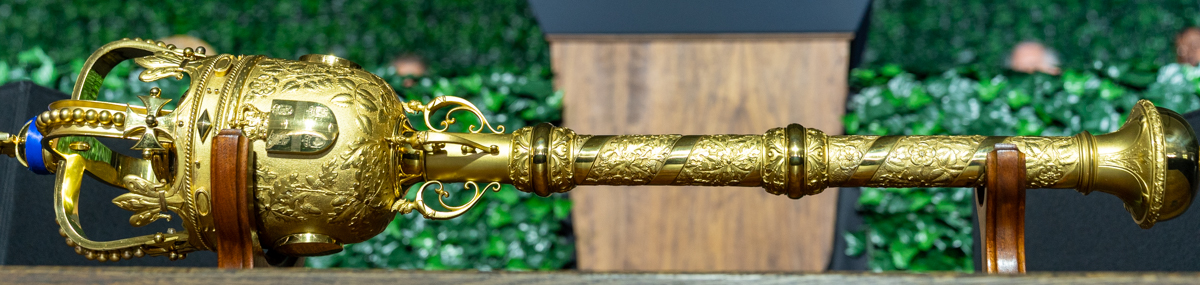
The current mace has been in use since 1974

The Mace of the Virginia House of Delegates is a symbol of government and legislative authority of the American Commonwealth of Virginia's House of Delegates.

== Original mace ==
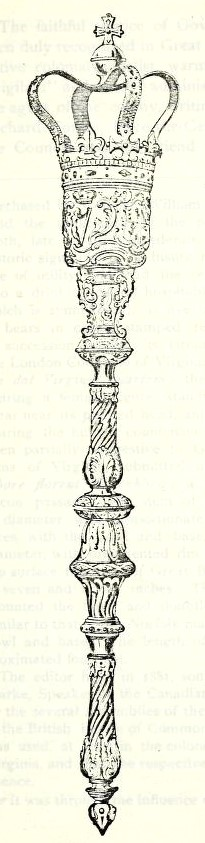
Mace, circa 1883

The original mace used in the House of Delegates was a silver ceremonial mace presented by the Royal Governor to the House of Burgesses of the Colony of Virginia in 1700. Following the Declaration of Independence and the establishment of the Commonwealth of Virginia, this mace continued to be used by the House of Delegates as a symbol of government authority. In 1792, after consideration of the inconsistency of using a royal symbol in a republican assembly, the House passed bills to dispose of the old mace and acquire two new maces for the House and the state Senate. The motion in the House noted "It is inconsistent [sic] with the principles of a republican government, that any badge of appendage of Kingly pomp should remain therein."

For the next two years, efforts were made to design a new mace for the House. Secretary of State Thomas Jefferson was involved in this work, opposing an early proposal that included a rattlesnake and suggesting "the Roman staves & axe, trite as it is; or perhaps a sword, sheathed in a roll of parchment." A final design for the new mace was never selected; by 1793, concerns over the cost put the plan on hold and the House resolved to sell the existing mace. By December 1794, the 101-ounce silver mace had been sold, for $101, to two partners in a Virginia silversmith firm.

== Current mace ==
For nearly 180 years, Virginia met without a mace. In 1974, an Edwardian-style ceremonial mace in silver, with a 24 karat gold wash, was acquired for the Virginia House of Delegates. It was purchased by the Jamestown Yorktown Foundation and presented to the House.

It is reinforced with wood, and has four sections with designs of oak leaves, acorns, and flowers that resemble the Virginia state flower, the dogwood. The mace was made in England in 1938 and passed through several owners before being purchased by an art dealer.

Each day that the House is in session, the mace is placed in the House chamber by the sergeant-at-arms, Jay Pearson. When not in use, the mace is on display in the old hall of the House of Delegates.

== See also ==
- Mace of the United States House of Representatives
