= Mace of the United States House of Representatives =

Ceremonial object

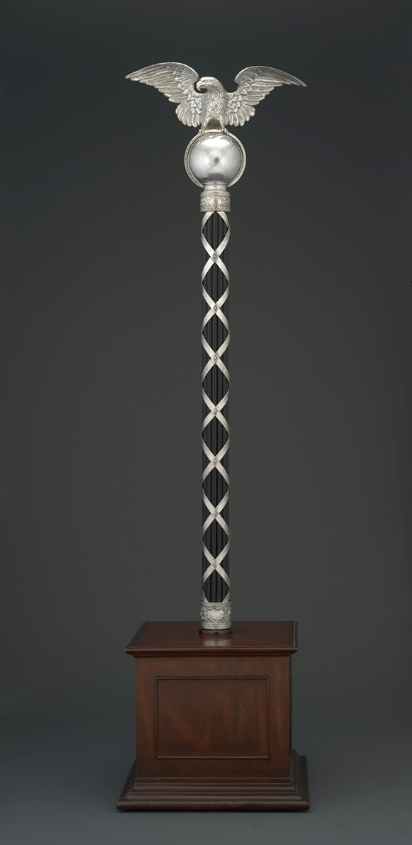
The Mace of the US House of Representatives

The Mace of the United States House of Representatives, also called the Mace of the Republic, is a ceremonial mace that symbolizes the governmental authority of the United States, and more specifically, the legislative authority of the House of Representatives.

== History ==
In one of its first resolutions, the U.S. House of Representatives of the 1st Federal Congress (April 14, 1789) established the Office of the Sergeant at Arms. The resolution stated "a proper symbol of office shall be provided for the Sergeant at Arms, of such form and device as the Speaker shall direct." The first Speaker of the House, Frederick Muhlenberg of Pennsylvania, approved the mace as the proper symbol of the Sergeant at Arms in carrying out the duties of this office. The first mace was destroyed when the Capitol Building was burned on August 24, 1814, during the War of 1812. A simple wooden mace was used in the interim.

The current mace has been in use since December 29, 1841. It was created by New York silversmith William Adams, at a cost of $400, equivalent to $13,000 in 2025.

During the January 6, 2021 attack attempting to prevent Congress from certifying the 2020 presidential election, Joyce Hamlett, the Keeper of the Mace, rushed it off the floor of the House chamber to protect it from intruders.

=== Symbolic use ===
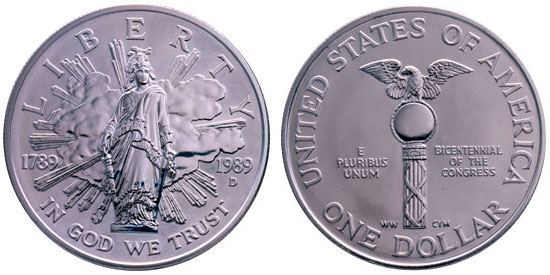
The reverse of the 1989 U.S. Congress Bicentennial commemorative silver dollar features the mace.

During the 2019 State of the Union Address, Nancy Pelosi wore a brooch styled after the Mace, as a symbol of her authority as Speaker. Speaker Pelosi wore the same brooch on December 18, 2019, for the session in which the House debated and approved two articles of impeachment of Donald Trump and again on February 4, 2020 during the 2020 State of the Union Address.

On January 15, 2021, Pelosi wore the brooch signaling to members of Congress that an investigation with likely disciplinary action lay ahead over the 2021 storming of the United States Capitol. Pelosi wore the brooch on March 1, 2022 during President Biden's first State of the Union address. She also wore the brooch as she delivered remarks before the House chamber on November 17, 2022, announcing her decision to step down as leader of the House Democratic Caucus.

== Description ==
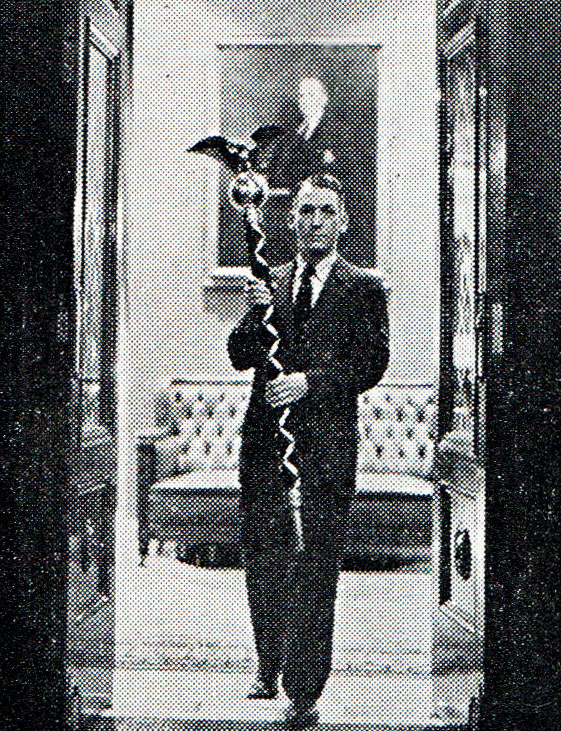
A man holding the mace, to show scale

The design of the mace is derived from an ancient battle weapon and the Roman fasces. The ceremonial mace is 46 inches (120 cm) high and consists of 13 ebony rods—representing the original 13 states of the Union—bound together by silver strands criss-crossed over the length of the pole. The rods are bound together by four crossing ribbons of silver, pinned together and held at the bottom and at the top by silver bands. The bands are decorated with floral borders and a repoussé design.

The name “Wm. Adams/Manufacturer/New York/1841.” is engraved in the cartouche, located in the front center of the bottom band. This shaft is topped by a silver globe 4-1/2 inches in diameter and engraved with the seven continents, the names of the oceans, lines of longitude, and the major lines of latitude. The Western Hemisphere faces the front. The globe is encircled with a silver rim marked with the degrees of latitude, on which is perched an engraved solid silver eagle with a wingspan of 15 inches. The total weight of the mace is 13 pounds.

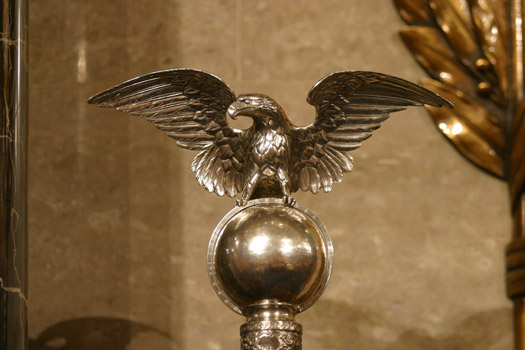
Sitting above the ebony rods of the mace is a cast-silver globe, which holds an eagle with spread wings. The continents are etched into the globe, with North America facing front. The eagle, the national bird, is cast in solid silver.

== Procedure ==
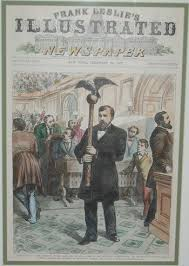
John G. Thompson, sergeant at arms House of Representatives from Dec. 1875 to Dec 1881, holding the mace

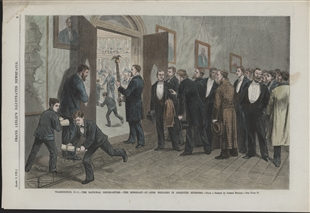
John G. Thompson, sergeant at arms from Dec. 1875 to Dec 1881, holding the mace

For daily sessions of the House, the Sergeant at Arms carries the silver and ebony mace of the House in front of the Speaker, in procession to the rostrum. When the House is in session, the mace stands on a cylindrical pedestal of green marble to the Speaker's right. When the House is in committee, it is moved to a lowered position on a pedestal next to the Sergeant at Arms' desk, more or less out of sight. Thus, members entering the chamber know immediately whether the House is in session or in committee.

=== Disciplinary usage ===
In accordance with the House Rules, on the rare occasion that a member becomes unruly, the Sergeant at Arms, upon order of the Speaker, lifts the mace from its pedestal and presents it before the offenders, thereby restoring order.

There have been at least six instances where the Mace was used to quell disorder. The first known usage of the original mace occurred at the Congress Hall in Philadelphia on January 30, 1798, during a fight between Matthew Lyon of Vermont and Roger Griswold of Connecticut, after which Lyon faced an unsuccessful expulsion vote.

The mace was used to restore order on the House floor on the evening of January 31, 1877, during a special session regarding the election in Florida. Tensions flared and Speaker Samuel Randall "was unable to stop the Members from running from desk to desk, while conducting loud conversations." The Sergeant at Arms presented the Mace, but to little effect. House rules state that Members should be arrested when ignoring the authority of the Mace, but in this case since there were so many members involved, the Speaker adjourned the session.

In 1880, as the House met to discuss a funding bill as the Committee of the Whole, James B. Weaver of Iowa and William A.J. Sparks of Illinois became involved in a heated discussion, with members attempting to keep them apart. The Speaker ordered the Sergeant at Arms to walk about the floor of the House with the Mace, and order was restored. It was used twice in the 1890s in incidents involving Representative Charles L. Bartlett, a fiery Georgia Democrat who hurled a volume of laws at one colleague and brandished a knife at another.

House records indicate that the mace was last used to restore order during World War I when Representative J. Thomas (Cotton Tom) Heflin of Alabama suggested that some of his colleagues had been unpatriotic in voting against a resolution to enter the war.

A threat to present the mace was made on July 29, 1994, when Rep. Maxine Waters declined to stop speaking. The Speaker Pro Tempore, Rep. Carrie Meek, threatened "to present the mace". Waters left the floor shortly thereafter, and Meek said that she had been about to order the Sergeant at Arms to present it.

== Gallery ==
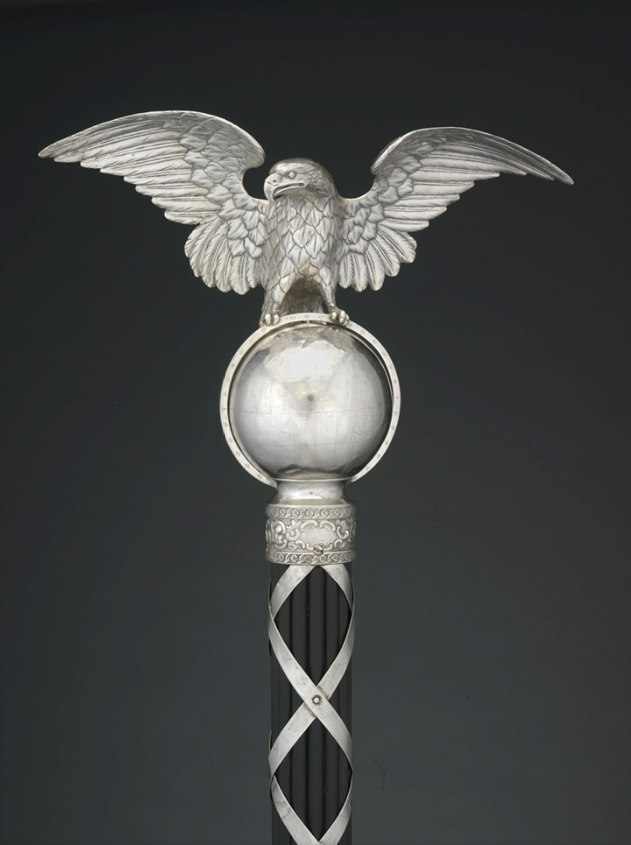
The front of the globe and eagle atop the Mace

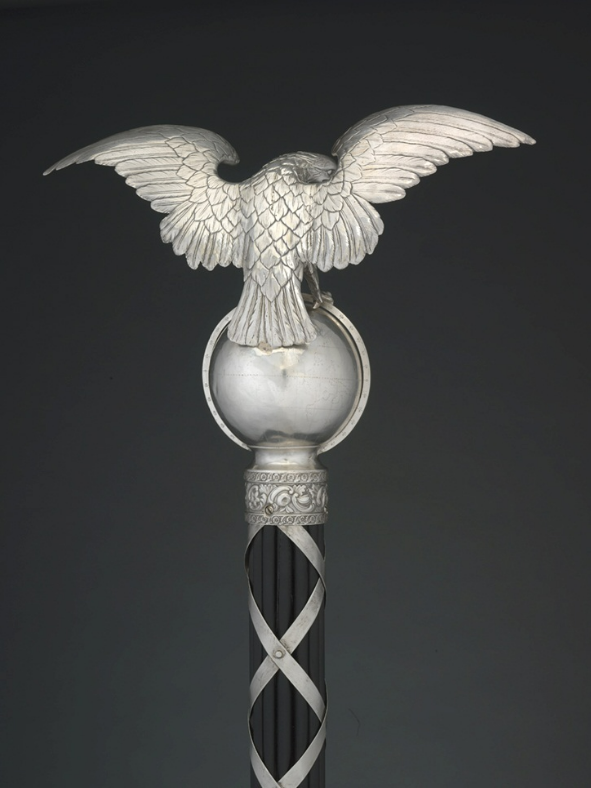
The rear of the globe and eagle atop the Mace

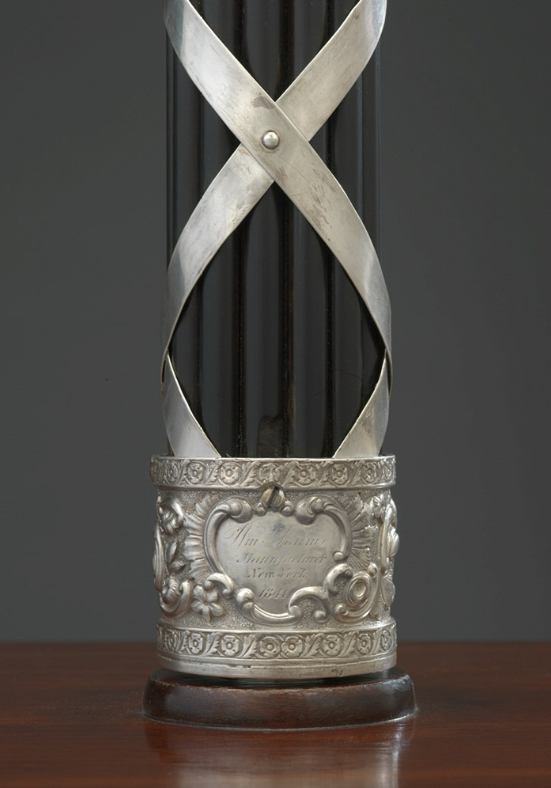
The base of the Mace, bearing the manufacturer's name and year of production

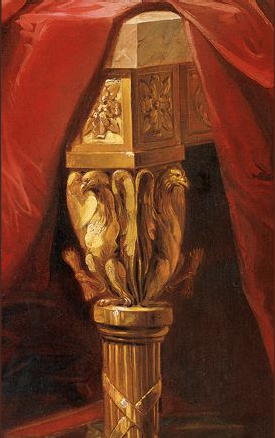
From the Lansdowne Portrait: the table leg may have been inspired by a wooden ceremonial mace used by the U.S. House of Representatives. The U.S. House symbol was inspired by the Roman fasces. The House mace was a bundle of tied reeds topped with a bald eagle, an American symbol.

== See also ==
- Ceremonial maces in the British Isles
- Mace of the Virginia House of Delegates
- Sergeant at Arms of the United States Senate
