= Fasces =

Bound bundle of wooden rods, sometimes with an axe

A fasces image, with the axe in the middle of the bundle of rods

A fasces (/ˈfæsiːz/; Latin: [ˈfaskeːs]; a plurale tantum, from the Latin word fascis, meaning 'bundle'; Italian: fascio littorio) is a bound bundle of wooden rods, often, but not always, including an axe (occasionally two axes) with its blade emerging. The fasces is an Italian symbol that had its origin in the Etruscan civilization and was passed on to ancient Rome, where it symbolized a Roman king's power to punish his subjects, and later, a magistrate's power and jurisdiction. The axe has its own separate and older origin. Initially associated with the labrys (Ancient Greek: λάβρυς, romanized: lábrys; Latin: bipennis), (Note: The term for a single-bladed axe is hēmipélekys "half-pélekys", pélekys (πέλεκυς) being a synonym of lábrys; e.g. Il. 23.883.) the double-bitted axe, originally from Crete, is one of the oldest symbols of Greek civilization.

The image of fasces has survived in the modern world as a representation of magisterial power, law, and governance. The fasces frequently occurs as a charge in heraldry: it is present on the reverse of the U.S. Mercury dime coin and it was the origin of the name of the National Fascist Party in Italy (from which the term fascism is derived).

During the first half of the twentieth century, both the fasces and the swastika (each symbol having its own unique ancient religious and mythological associations) became heavily identified with the fascist political movements of Benito Mussolini and Adolf Hitler. This is due to Mussolini's more active usage of the symbol and the campaigns of Hitler, Nazis, and anti-fascists alike to make various allusions and comparisons between the two dictators to associate Hitler with Mussolini and his symbolism. During this period, the swastika became deeply stigmatized, but the fasces did not undergo a similar process outside of Italy.

The fasces remained in use in many societies after World War II because it had already been adopted and incorporated into the iconography of numerous governments outside of Italy prior to Mussolini. Such iconographical use persists in governmental and various other contexts. In contrast, the swastika remains in common usage only in Asia, where it originated as an ancient South Asian symbol, and in Navajo iconography, where its religious significance is entirely unrelated to, and predates, early 20th-century European fascism.

== Symbolism ==
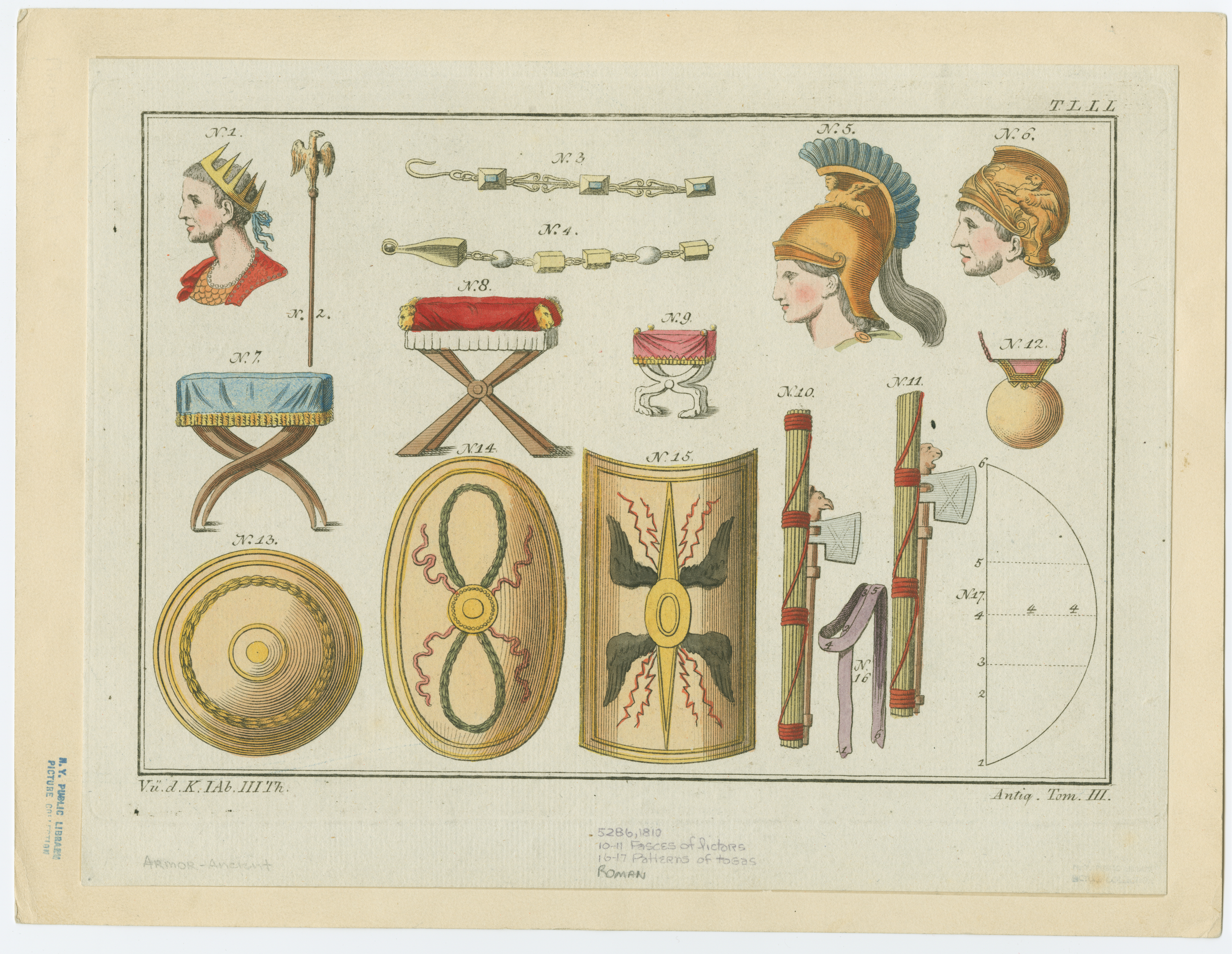
A print depicting Roman armour and accessories, including two versions of the fasces (seen in the lower right)

The fasces, as a bundle of rods with an axe, was a grouping of all the equipment needed to inflict corporal or capital punishment. In ancient Rome, the bundle was a material symbol of a Roman magistrate's full civil and military power, known as imperium. They were carried in a procession with a magistrate by lictors, who carried the fasces and, at times, used the birch rods as punishment to enforce obedience with magisterial commands. In common language and literature, the fasces were regularly associated with certain offices: praetors were referred to in Greek as the hexapelekys (lit. 'six axes'), and the consuls were referred to as "the twelve fasces" as literary metonymy. Beyond serving as insignia of office, it also symbolised the Roman Republic and its prestige.

After the classical period and with the fall of the Roman state, thinkers were removed from the "psychological terror generated by the original Roman fasces" in the antique period. By the Renaissance, there emerged a conflation of the fasces with a Greek fable first recorded by Babrius in the second century AD, which depicted how individual sticks can be easily broken but a bundle could not. This story is common across Eurasian culture and by the thirteenth century AD was recorded in the Secret History of the Mongols. While there is no historical connection between the original fasces and this fable, by the sixteenth century AD, fasces were "inextricably linked" with interpretations of the fable as one expressing unity and harmony.

== In the ancient world ==
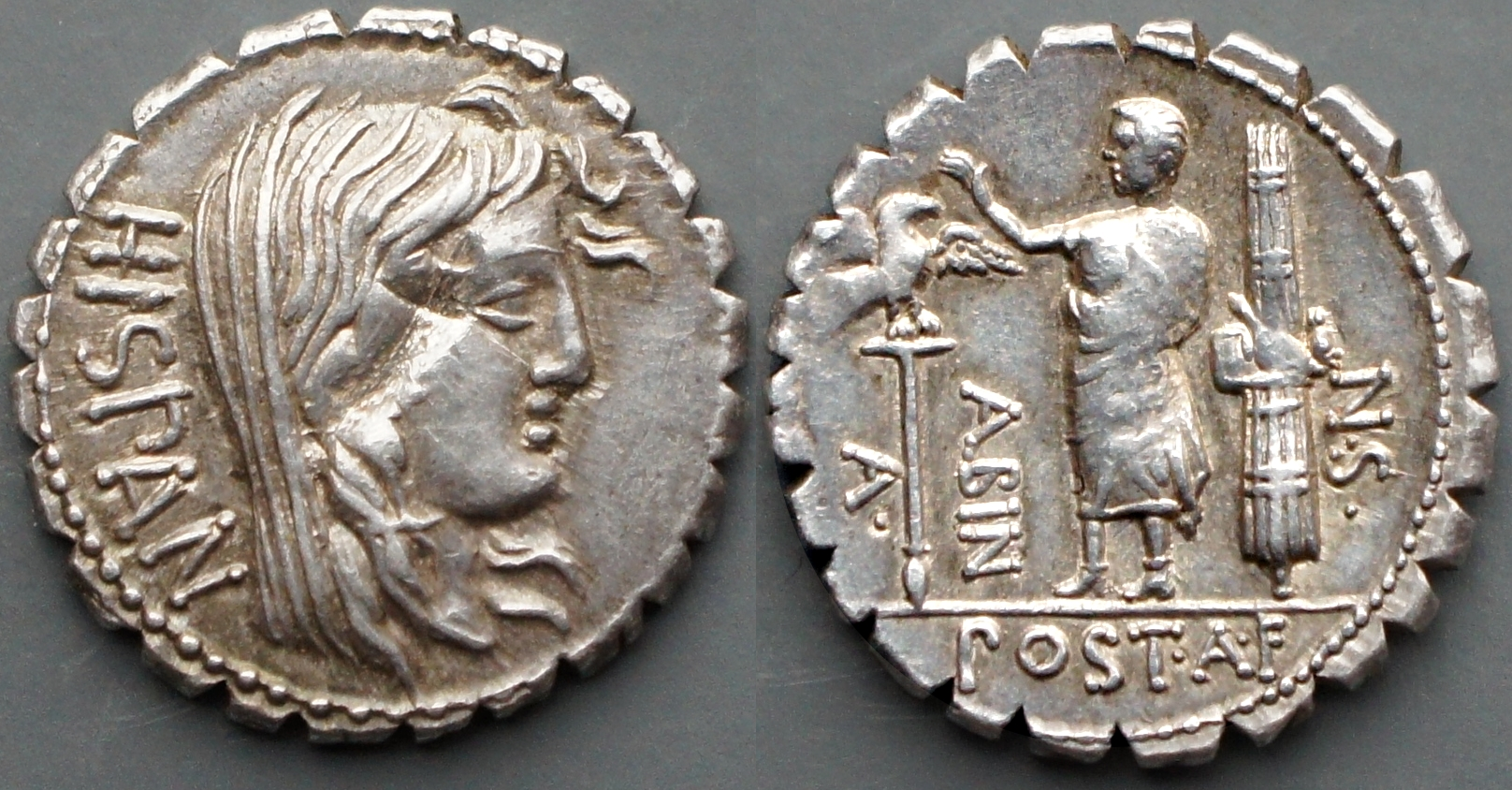
Aquila (Legionary eagle), toga figure, and fasces on reverse side of coinage

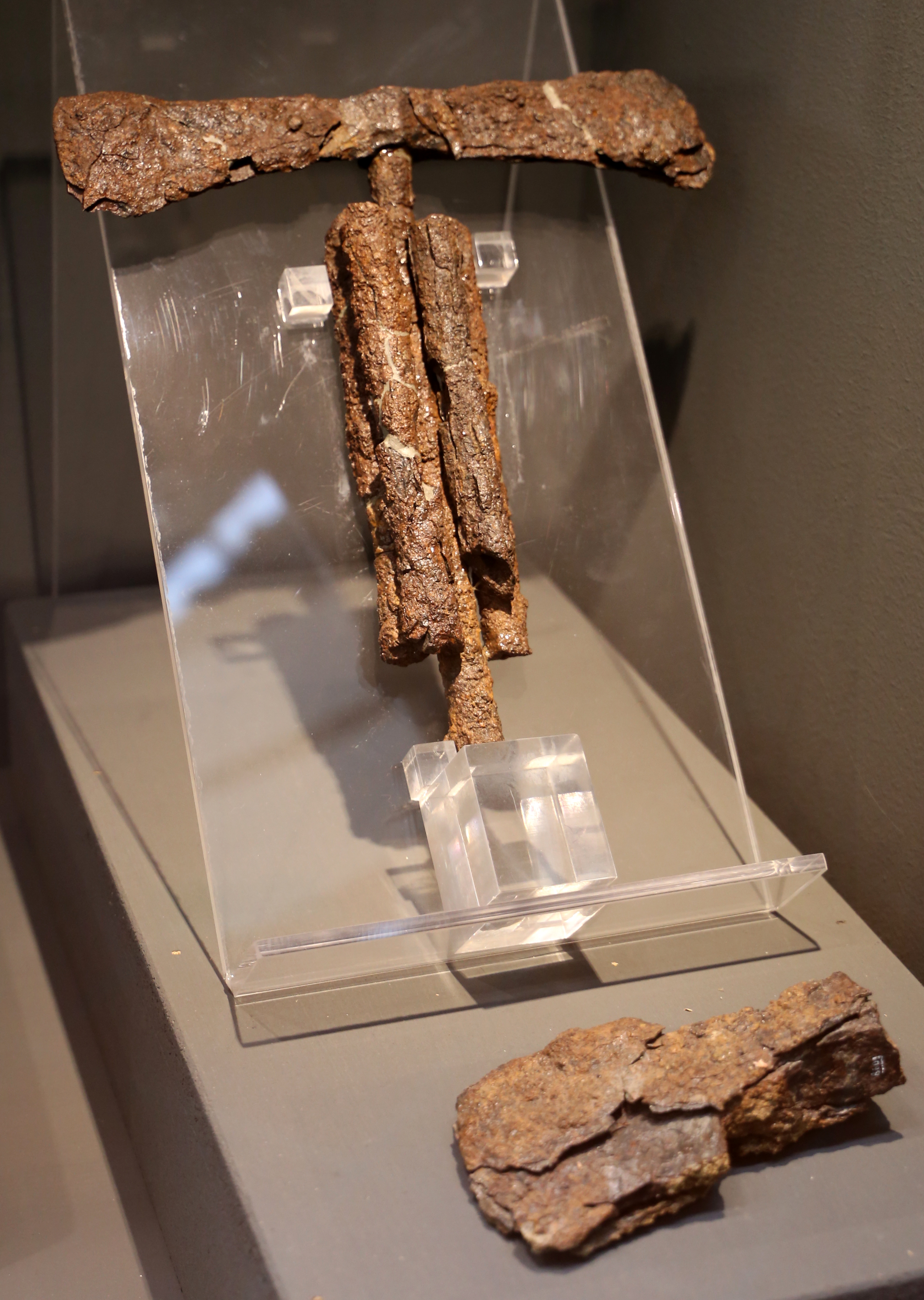
Earliest depiction of a fasces, c. 610 BC, discovered as a grave good in Vetulonia in 1897

=== Origin ===
The English word fasces comes from Latin, with singular fascis. The word is usually used in its plural to refer to magisterial insignia, but is sometimes used to refer to bushels or bundles in an agricultural context. This word itself comes from the Indo-European root *bhasko-, referring to a bundle.

The earliest archaeological remains of a fasces are those discovered in a necropolis near the Etruscan hamlet now called Vetulonia by the archaeologist Isidoro Falchi in 1897. The discovery is now dated to the relatively narrow range of 630–625 BC, which coincides with the traditional dating of Rome's legendary fifth king, Lucius Tarquinius Priscus. An Etruscan origin, furthermore, is supported by ancient literary evidence: the poet Silius Italicus, who flourished in the late 1st century AD, posited that Rome adopted many of its emblems of office – viz the fasces, the curule chair, and the toga praetexta – specifically from Vetulonia. A story of Etruscan origin is further supported by Dionysius of Halicarnassus in his antiquarian work, Roman Antiquities.

=== Rome ===
==== Regal period ====
Ancient Roman literary sources are unanimous in describing the ancient kings of Rome as being accompanied by twelve lictors carrying fasces. Dionysius, in Roman Antiquities, gave a complex story explaining this number: for him, the practice originated in Etruria, and each bundle symbolised one of the twelve Etruscan city-states; the twelve states together represented a joint military campaign, and were given to the Etruscan king of Rome, Tarquinius Priscus, on his accession to the throne. While Livy concurred with Dionysius' story, he also relates a different story ascribing fasces to the first Roman king, Romulus, who selected twelve to correspond to the twelve birds which appeared in augury at the founding of Rome.

Later stories gave different aetiologies: some described fasces as coming from Latium, others from Italy in general. Macrobius, writing in the 5th century AD, has the Romans taking fasces from the Etruscans as spoils of war rather than adopted by cultural diffusion. In general, it seems that by the sixth century BC, fasces had become a common symbol in central Italy and Etruria – if not also into southern Italy, as Livy implies – for royal prestige and coercive power. The ancient Roman literary record largely depicts the fasces of their time as carried largely symbolically by lictors who were present primarily to defend their charges from violence. However, the same stories depict fasces far more negatively in the context of tyrannies or regal displays.

Plutarch, in his Life of Publicola, describes an incident in which Lucius Junius Brutus, the first Roman consul, has lictors scourge with rods and decapitate with axes – components of the fasces – his own sons, who were conspiring to restore the Tarquins to the throne. After Brutus' alleged death in battle, Publicola then passed reforms subordinating magisterial use of fasces for coercion to the people: consuls would lower the fasces before the people during speeches, and there would be appeal to the people against a magistrate ordering capital or corporal punishment.

==== Republican period ====
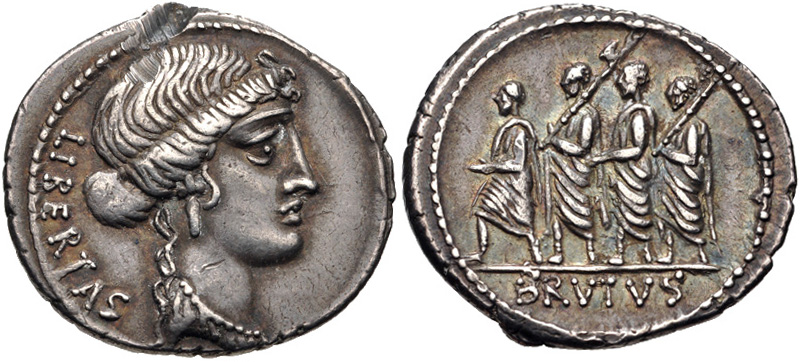
Denarius minted by Marcus Junius Brutus depicting a personification of Libertas on left and Lucius Junius Brutus with lictors carrying bladed fasces on right

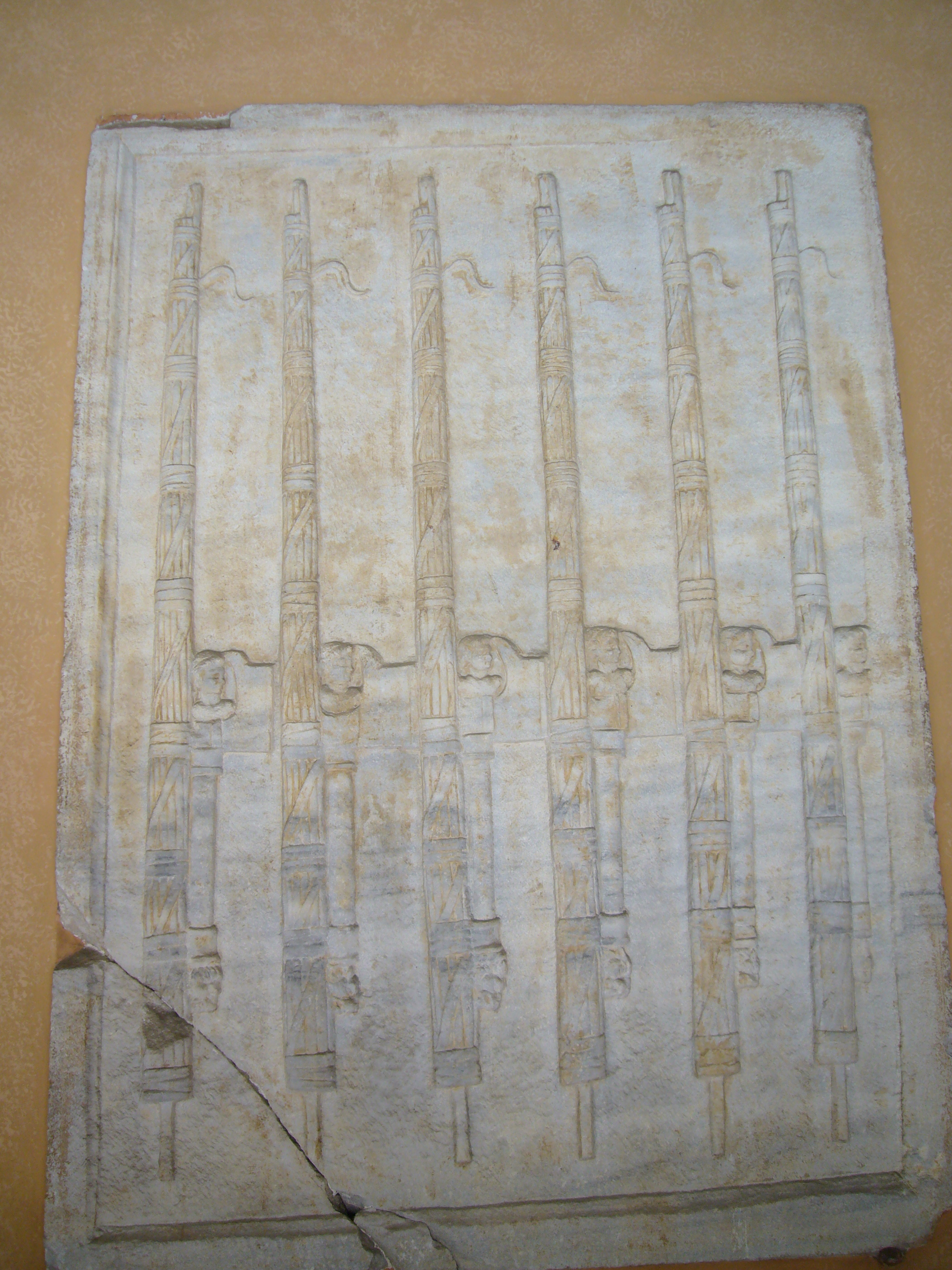
Rome, cloister of San Paolo, outside wall: marble panel depicting six fasces.

During the republic, the Romans used the number of fasces accompanying a magistrate to mark out rank and distinction. The two consuls each had 12 lictors, as did the traditional dictators. The late republican dictators (of which Sulla was the first) were accompanied by 24 lictors and fasces. However, the consuls alternated initiative by month. The consul without initiative would retain a veto on the other consul's actions, but would be preceded only by an accensus and be followed by lictors bearing reduced fasces.

Praetors normally held six fasces and were so described on campaign in Greek sources. There were, however, some exceptions. After 197 BC, praetors sent to Hispania were dispatched with proconsular status and therefore received twelve fasces. Around the same time, in the lex Plaetoria, the number of fasces accompanying a praetor in court was reduced to merely two, possibly because a praetor in court "with six fasces might seem imperious".

By the late second century BC, magistrates who had won victories abroad that were proclaimed imperator, a victory title, were decorated with laurel. This acclamation was a necessary prerequisite for celebrating a triumph, a prestigious award for which commanders might wait years. Within the pomerium, Rome's sacred city boundary, the magistrates normally removed the axes from their fasces to symbolise the appealable nature of their civic powers. However, an exception was made during a triumph, when the triumphing general's military auspices were extended into the city, so that he could make sacrifices at the Temple of Jupiter on the Capitoline Hill. The laurels decorating the triumphator's axed fasces were removed and decided in a ceremony, placing them in the lap of the cult statue of the Capitoline Jupiter.

During the republic, only persons possessing imperium were granted full complements of fasces; the number granted to promagistrates for their analogous rank was not diminished. Lieutenants exercising delegated imperium were, in the late republic, regularly granted two fasces. When others were sometimes assigned lictors as bodyguards or otherwise to assist in official duties, they probably did not carry fasces. Italian municipal officials during the republic were usually accompanied by local lictors, but these lictors did not carry fasces until imperial times.

Popular resistance to magistrates during the late republic sometimes took the form of mobs smashing magisterial fasces. In 133 BC, Tiberius Gracchus incited a mob to take and break a praetor's fasces; two praetors, a certain Brutus and Servilius, were dispatched in 88 BC to order Lucius Cornelius Sulla, then consul, to desist from his march on Rome, and had their insignia of office defaced and destroyed; Marcus Calpurnius Bibulus's lictors were set upon in 59 BC when he, along with some plebeian tribunes, attempted to veto Julius Caesar's land reform bill during their joint consulship, leading to his lictors' fasces being lost entirely. This last breaking of fasces was "a ritualistic act of symbolic violence (the People thus disposing of tokens of the imperium that was in their gift) that substituted for direct physical violence against the person of the consul".

==== Imperial period ====
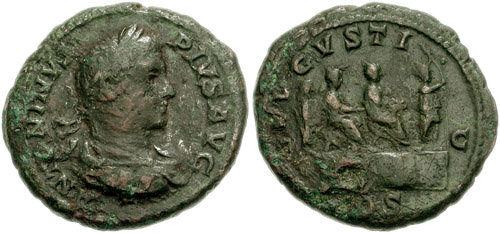
Sestertius of Caracalla, 202–204. The reverse depicts the emperors Caracalla and Septimius on a platform (central characters); on the right is a lictor holding the new curved fascis.

During the Roman Empire, the number of people who were entitled to fasces and lictors expanded. Fasces were first granted to Vestal Virgins by the Senate in 42 BC, when the six vestals were allowed one lictor each. They were joined by fasces granted to the three major flamines (high priests). Single lictors also preceded members of the sodales Augustales, who were priests of the imperial cult. At the death of the first emperor, Augustus, in AD 14, his widow, Livia, was voted a lictor by the Senate, though sources disagree as to whether she ever exercised the privilege.

The division of the Roman provinces into imperial and senatorial provinces, with Augustus holding proconsular imperium over the imperial provinces and administering them through legates, also further expanded the number of fasces. Augustus appointed legates with imperium pro praetore as governors, each of which was granted five lictors. When Italy was divided into fourteen regions in 7 BC, the curator of each region was granted two lictors while in office and on station. After the creation of the aerarium militare (military treasury) in AD 6, the three ex-praetors administering it were each granted two lictors as well. Municipal magistrates' lictors also gained fasces during the imperial period.

By the reign of the Severans at the start of the third century, fasces had been redesigned. Depicted on a sestertius struck c. AD 203, fasces no longer took the form of a bundle of sticks, but rather took the form of a long curved stick or two of such sticks bound together. The number of fasces granted to imperial governors titled proconsul stayed at twelve into the late fourth century AD; governors of the rank consularis received five fasces, but most governors (with the rank praeses) had no fasces at all. This later form persisted through to the Eastern Roman Empire: the Byzantine antiquarian, John the Lydian, writing in the sixth century AD, described fasces as "long rods evenly bound together" with red straps and axes held aloft. Into the mediaeval period, Byzantine emperors remained guarded by men – by the 14th century, the Varangian Guard – carrying staves and axes.

== Post-classical reception ==
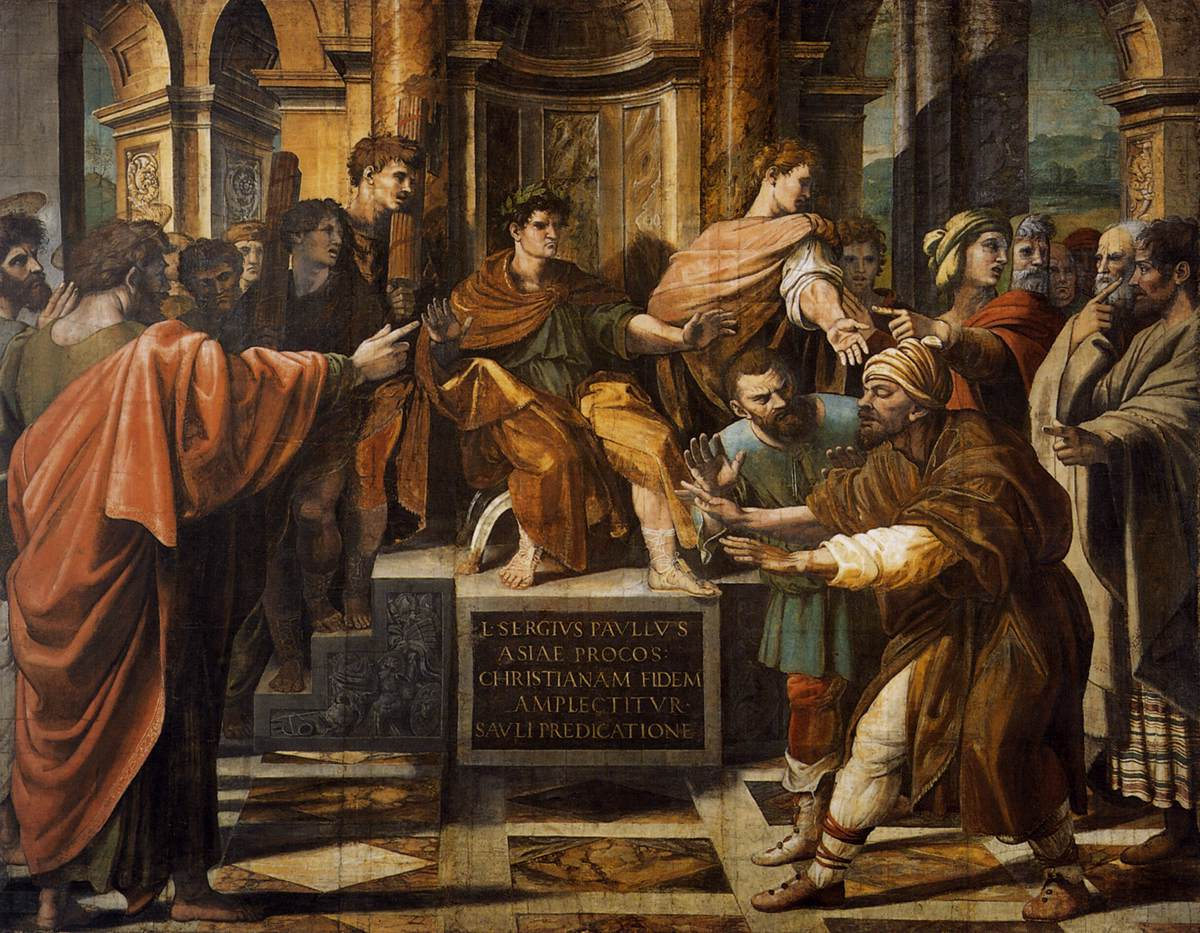
Raphael's Conversion of the Proconsul (1515), depicting fasces to the left of the magistrate

While the Latin word fasces did not fall out of use in the mediaeval period, its technical meaning was forgotten. By the end of the first millennium, it was glossed as "somehow connot[ing] 'supreme power' or 'official honours.'" For example, c. 1439, Jean de Rovroy, when translating Frontinus' Stratagems, was deceived by a false cognate, and thought fasces referred to ribbons that Roman magistrates would wear on their heads; such misconceptions were apparently common, and dated back to the 11th century. Visual representations of the bundle itself were rare – the 11th century AD Junius manuscript excepted – until the Renaissance.

=== Renaissance ===
Renaissance humanists, especially those who read more Latin, however, quickly became well-informed on fasces and their legal technicalities, including the customary removal of axes within the city, lowering before the people, and alternation by the consuls. By the first decade of the 16th century, references to fasces in a more Roman context started to appear. At the same time, recognisable depictions started to reappear in Italy, such as Raphael's painting, Conversion of the Proconsul (c. 1515).

By the mid-1500s, the fasces also began to symbolise other things which would have been "unimportant or even unknown to the Romans". Pope Clement VIII's reassertion of Papal juridical authority after the sack of Rome in 1527 started iconographic developments that would associate fasces with personifications of Justice.

Coat of arms of Cardinal Mazarin, the first to include fasces on arms in modern times

Syncretism of fasces with the Aesop fable of a bundle of sticks being harder to break than each stick alone associated fasces also with domestic concord, in addition to personifications of Concord as depicted in art. This symbology also merged with that of justice, in that unbinding the rods and axes promoted reflection over just action. In this context, Cardinal Mazarin placed fasces on his coat of arms, "the first individual in the modern era to do so".

From here, depictions of fasces exploded. Art historian Antje Middeldorf-Kosegarten, in Reallexikon zur Deutschen Kunstgeschichte (Eng. “Real Lexicon of German Art History”):

charts for the post-Ripa period [after 1603] a proliferation of the fasces as symbol across almost every conceivable visual medium, from architectural sculpture to decorative arts, in paintings of every type, on monuments that range from honorific arches to tombs, as well as in medallic art and engravings...

By the mid-seventeenth century, fasces had become "well established throughout Europe as a catch-all symbol for stable and competent governance". It also expanded to symbolise competent corporate governance. Yet, due to a massive expansion in meaning, the symbol seemed to have died by the 1760s, muddled as little more than a reference to the past.

=== Revolution ===
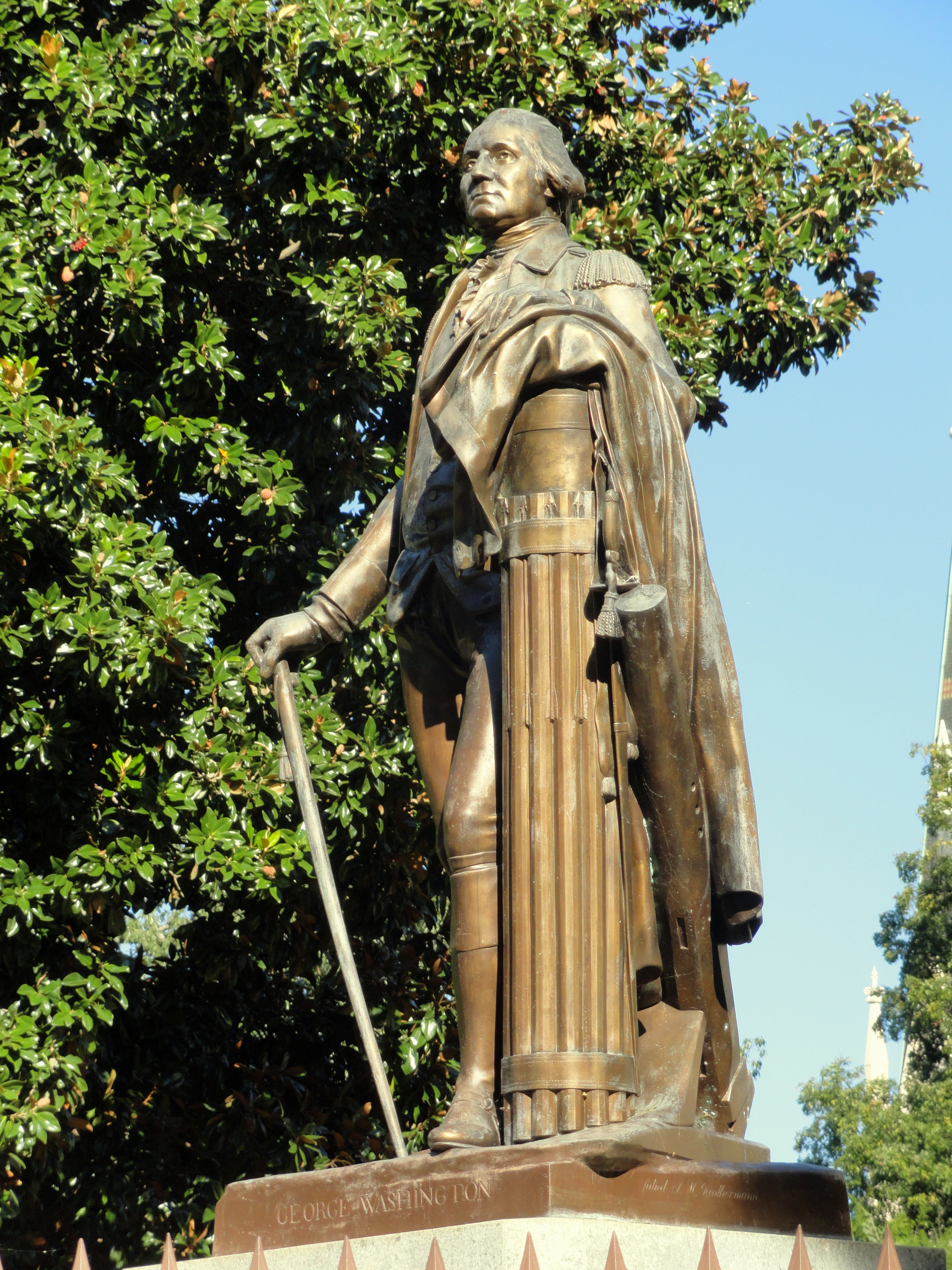
A bronze cast of Jean-Antoine Houdon's statue of George Washington. Washington's left arm rests on a cloak over fasces with thirteen rods.

As an emblem, fasces made their way to the colonies in British North America. There, during the American Revolution, the fasces' symbology as referencing strength through unity was adopted as a symbol of the united colonial effort against British rule.

Fasces similarly came to adopt a privileged symbology during the French Revolution. First referring to the 83 departments of 1789, as a symbol of unity, it came to be associated with fraternité and a united French people. Topped with a Phrygian cap, fasces were seen as a reference to the "imagined spirit of the early Roman republic [and] its assertion of ideals of liberty and justice against tyranny". In France, however, use of fasces as a symbol declined starting with the establishment of the Consulate in 1799 through to the proclamation of the Second Republic in 1848.

Similar usage proliferated in the aftermath of the French Revolution. Haiti, in its revolution against France, coined with many depictions of fasces, as did Mexico during its first republic, Ecuador, Chile, and the Roman Republic of 1798.

== Modern usage ==
An eagle perching on a fasces, a common symbol of fascism

Numerous governments and other authorities have used the image of the fasces as a symbol of power since the end of the Roman Empire. It also has been used to hearken back to the Roman Republic, particularly by those who see themselves as modern-day successors to that republic or its ideals.

The Ecuadorian coat of arms incorporated the fasces in 1830, although it had already been in use in the coat of arms of Gran Colombia.

=== Italy ===
The Italian word fascio (pl.: fasci), etymologically related to fasces, was used by various political organizations in the late 19th and early 20th centuries, with the figurative meaning of "league" or "union".

Italian Fascism, which derives its name from the fasces, arguably used this symbolism the most in the twentieth century. The British Union of Fascists also used it in the 1930s. The fasces, as a widespread and long-established symbol in the West, however, has avoided the stigma associated with much of fascist symbolism (except in Italy, where exhibiting the fasces can lead to an indictment) and many authorities continue to display them, including the federal government of the United States.

War flag of the Italian Social Republic

Flag of the National Fascist Party

Italian Fascist flag first seen used in the early 1920s, with this depiction being one variant of such flags that were the Italian tricolour flag with a fasces in the middle of it

Eagle perched on fasces, as adorned on caps and helmets of Fascist Italy

Fuselage roundel used on aircraft of the Italian air force during the Fascist period

Roundel used on the wings of aircraft of the Italian air force during the Fascist period

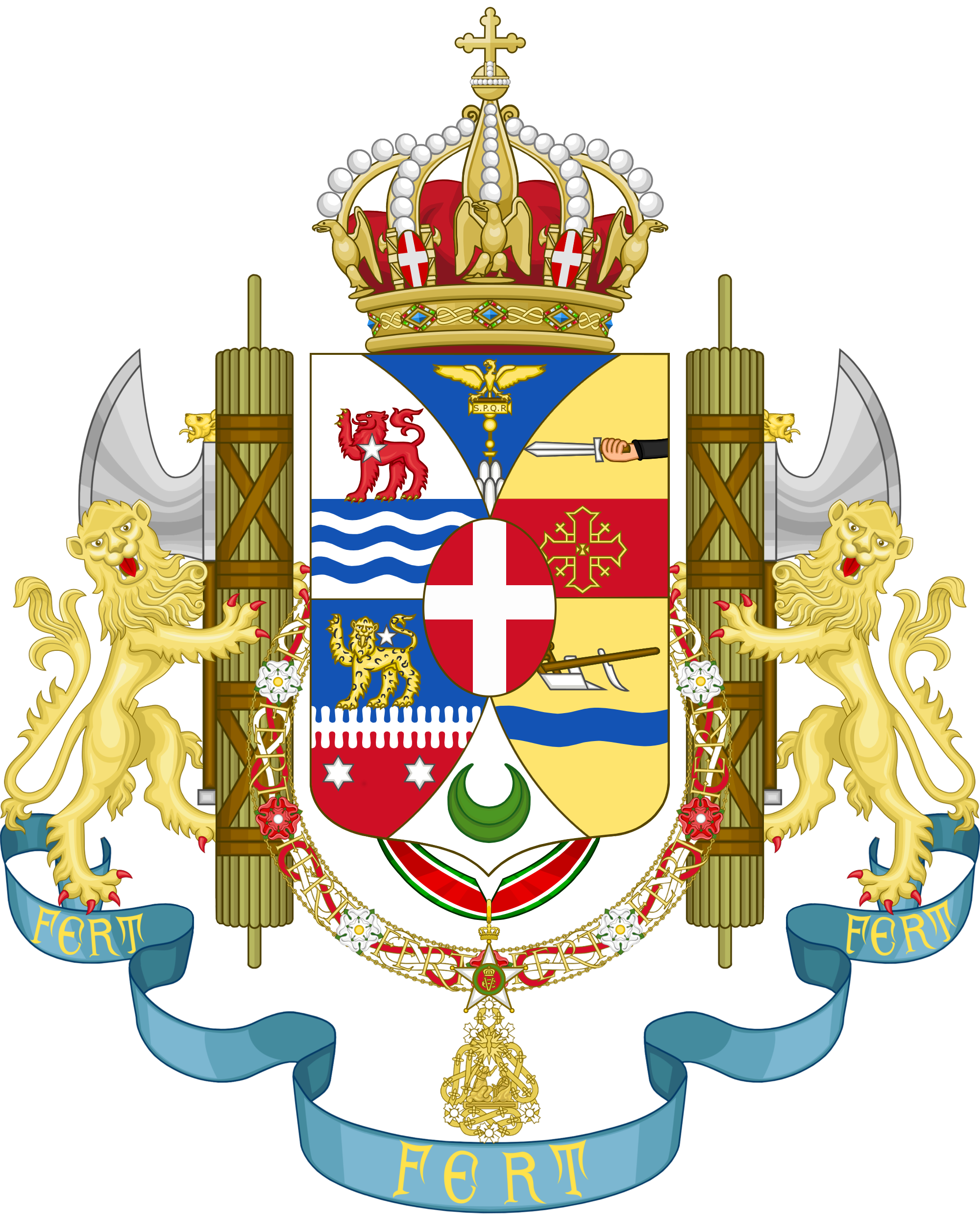
Coat of arms of Italian East Africa

One of the flags of the National Fascist Party with a simplified fasces

Flag of the National Fascist Party

=== France ===
A review of the images included in Les Grands Palais de France : Fontainebleau reveals that French architects used the Roman fasces (faisceaux romains) as a decorative device as early as the reign of Louis XIII (1610–1643) and continued to employ it through the periods of Napoleon I's Empire (1804–1815).

The fasces typically appeared in a context reminiscent of the Roman Republic and of the Roman Empire. The French Revolution used many references to the ancient Roman Republic in its imagery. During the First Republic, topped by the Phrygian cap, the fasces is a tribute to the Roman Republic and means that power belongs to the people. It also symbolizes the "unity and indivisibility of the Republic", as stated in the French Constitution. In 1848 and after 1870, it appears on the seal of the French Republic, held by the figure of Liberty. There is the fasces in the arms of the French Republic with the "RF" for République française (see image below), surrounded by leaves of olive tree (as a symbol of peace) and oak (as a symbol of justice). While it is used widely by French officials, this symbol never was officially adopted by the government.

President Valéry Giscard d'Estaing placed one on his presidential flag. In 2015, a logo representing a stylized fasces was used for internet communication by the Presidency of the French Republic. Since 1870, it has also appeared on the badges of deputies and senators known as barometers, which they place conspicuously on their vehicles.

The unofficial but common coat of arms of France depicts a fasces, representing justice

Images from Les Grands Palais de France : Fontainebleau

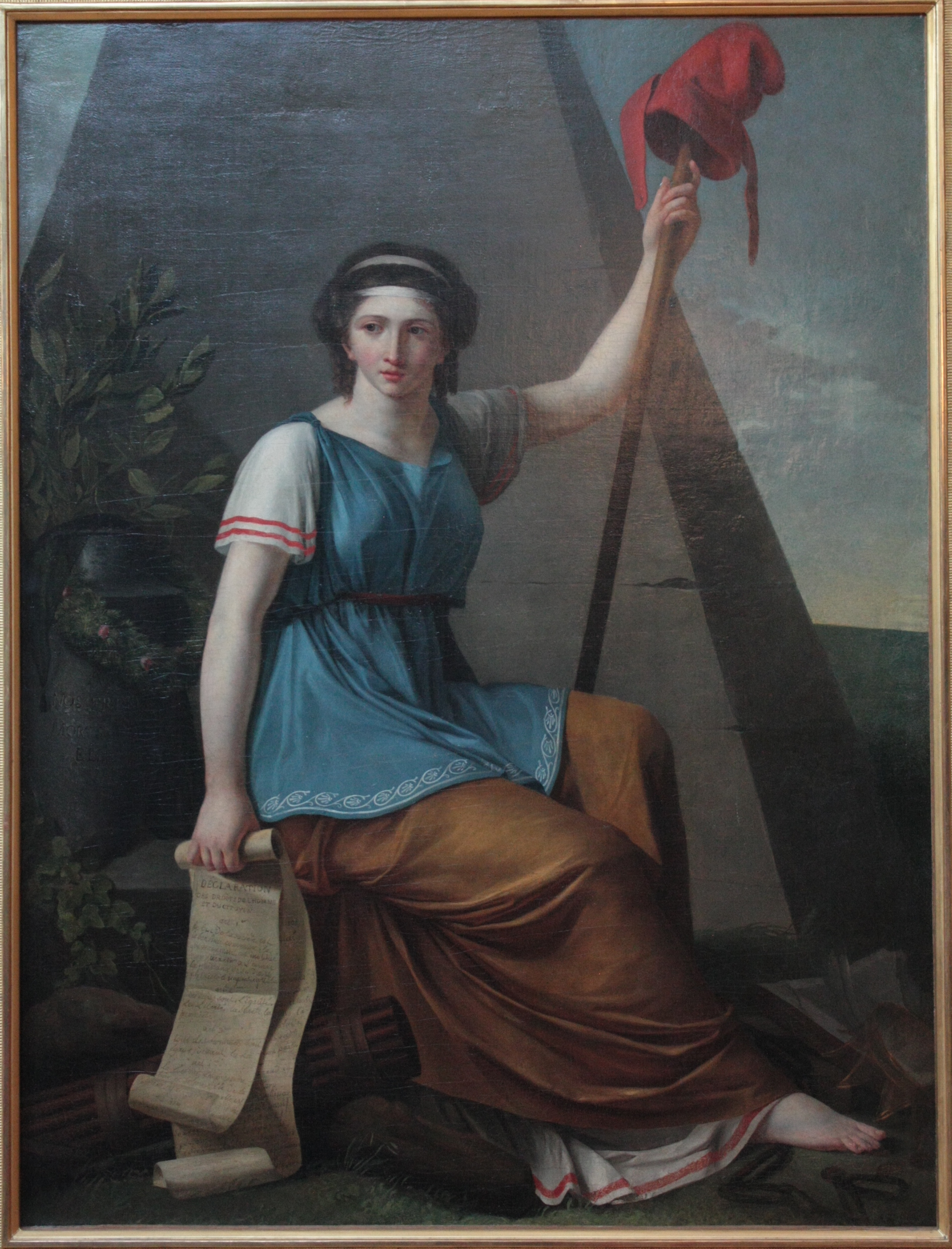
Nanine Vallain, Liberté, 1794

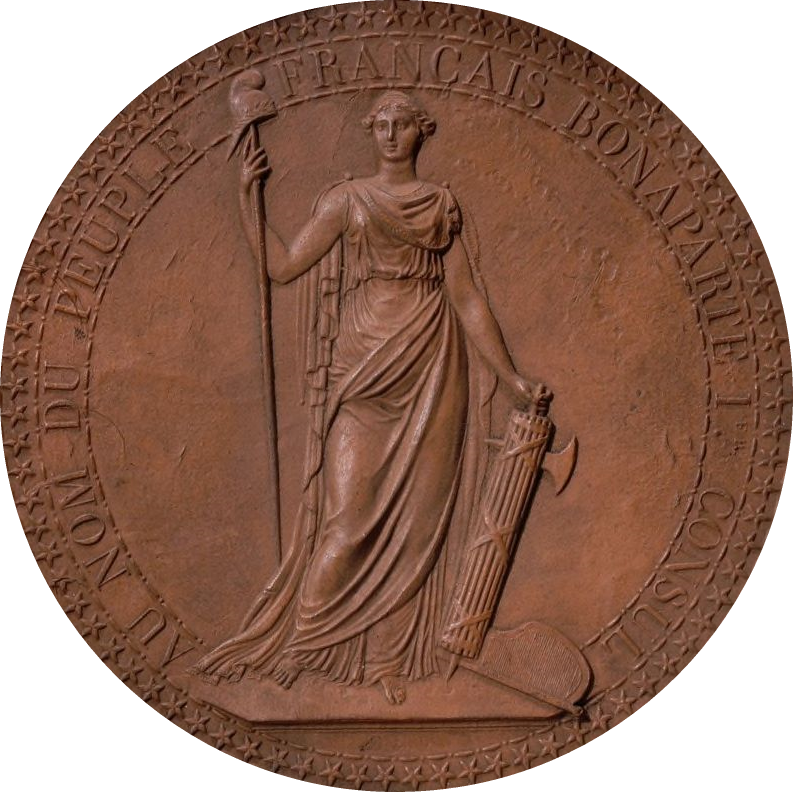
French Consulate Seal of Napoleon Bonaparte, 1799

Great Seal of France, 1848

=== United States ===
Seal of the United States Senate with two fasces at bottom

Since the original founding of the United States in the 18th century, several offices and institutions in the United States have heavily incorporated representations of the fasces into much of their iconography.

==== Federal fasces iconography ====
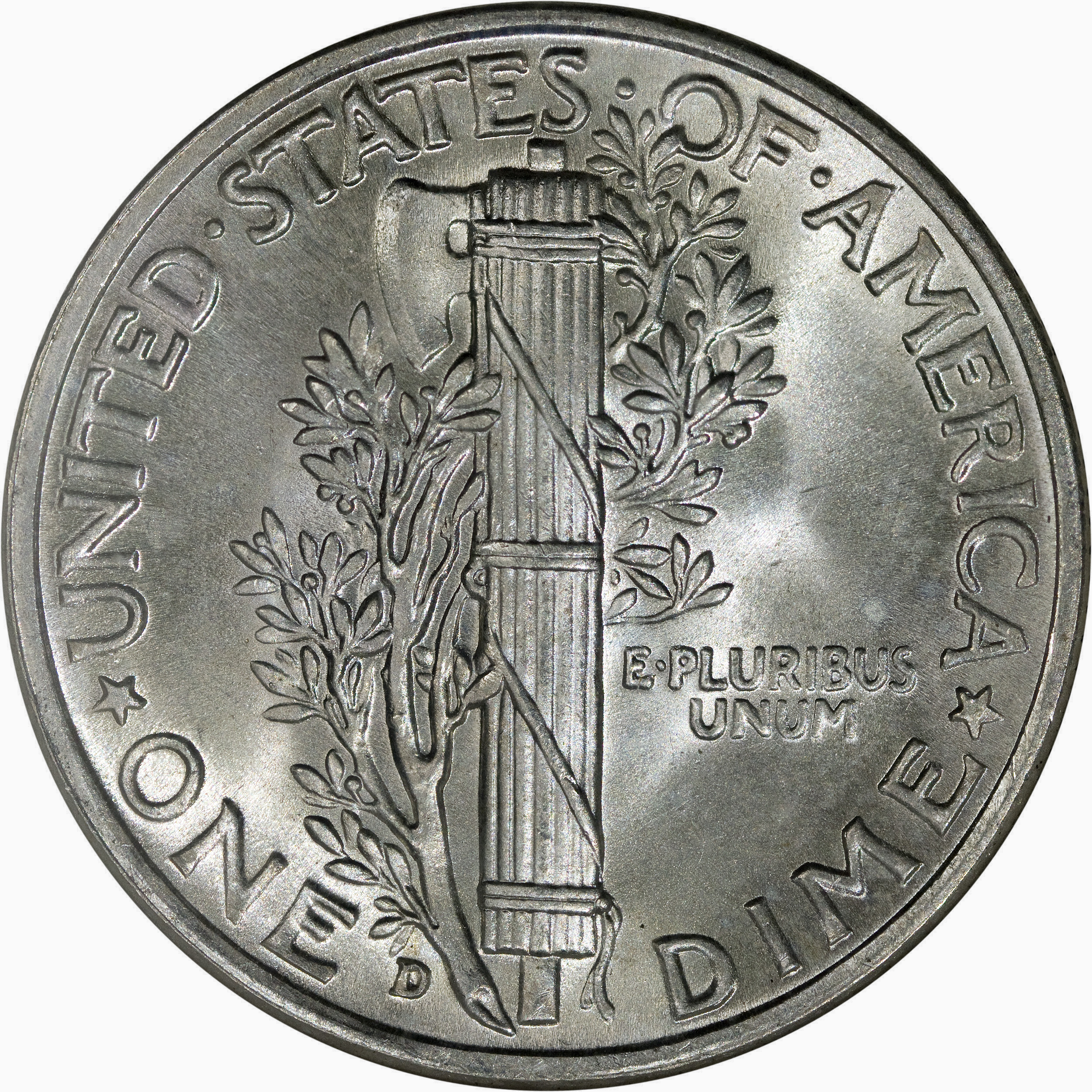
The reverse of the Mercury dime, with a fasces

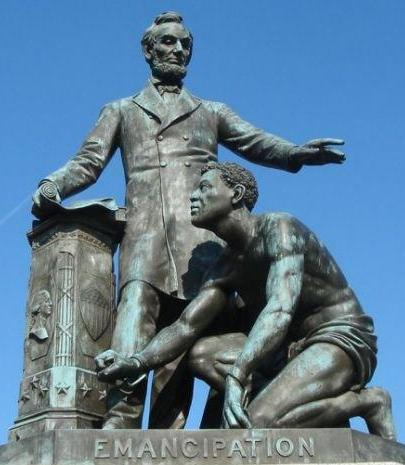
Emancipation Memorial

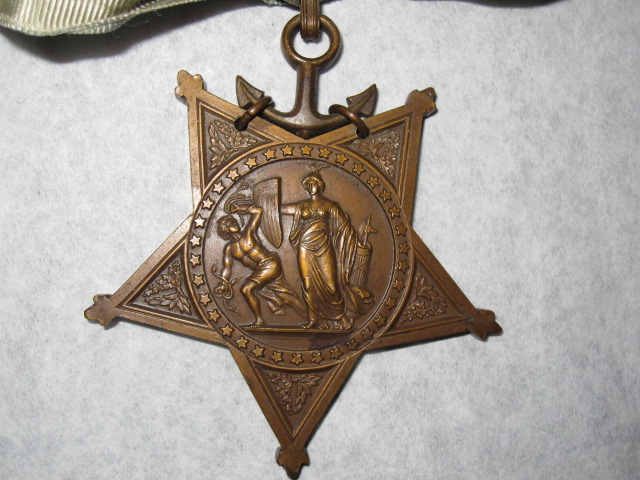
Navy Medal of Honor, depicting the goddess Minerva with a fasces

- On the podium of the Emancipation Memorial in Washington D.C., beneath Abraham Lincoln's right hand
- The reverse of the Mercury Dime, the design used from 1916 until the adoption of the current FDR dime in 1945, features a fasces.
- On the obverse of the 1896 $1 Educational Series note there is a fasces leaning against the wall behind the youth.
- In the Oval Office, above the door leading to the exterior walkway, and above the corresponding door on the opposite wall, which leads to the president's private office; the fasces depicted have no axes, possibly because in the Roman Republic, the blade was always removed from the bundle whenever the fasces were carried inside the city, in order to symbolize the rights of citizens against arbitrary state power (see above)
- Two fasces appear on either side of the flag of the United States behind the podium in the United States House of Representatives, with bronze examples replacing the previous gilded iron installments during the remodeling project of 1950.
- The Mace of the United States House of Representatives resembles fasces and consists of thirteen ebony rods bound together in the same fashion as the fasces, topped by a silver eagle on a globe
- The official seal of the United States Senate has as one component a pair of crossed fasces.
- Fasces ring the base of the Statue of Freedom atop the United States Capitol building.
- A frieze on the facade of the United States Supreme Court building depicts the figure of a Roman centurion holding a fasces, to represent "order".
- The National Guard uses the fasces on the seal of the National Guard Bureau, and it appears in the insignia of Regular Army officers assigned to National Guard liaison and in the insignia and unit symbols of National Guard units themselves; for instance, the regimental crest of the 71st Infantry Regiment (New York) of the New York National Guard consisted of a gold fasces set on a blue background.
- At the Lincoln Memorial, Lincoln's seat of state bears the fasces – without axes – on the fronts of its arms; fasces also appear on the pylons flanking the main staircase leading into the memorial.
- The official seal of the United States Tax Court bears the fasces at its center.
- Four fasces flank the two bronze plaques on either side of the bust of Lincoln memorializing his Gettysburg Address at Gettysburg, Pennsylvania.
- The seal of the United States Courts Administrative Office includes a fasces behind crossed quill and scroll.
- In the Washington Monument is a statue of George Washington leaning on a fasces.
- A fasces features prominently in the regimental insignia and coat of arms of the United States Military Police Corps, as well as on the insignias of the 14th, 18th, and 42nd Military Police Brigades.
- A fasces appears on the shoulder sleeve insignia of the US Army Reserve Legal Command.
- Seated beside George Washington, a figure holds a fasces as part of The Apotheosis of Washington, a fresco mural suspended above the rotunda of the United States Capitol Building.

==== State, local and other fasces iconography ====
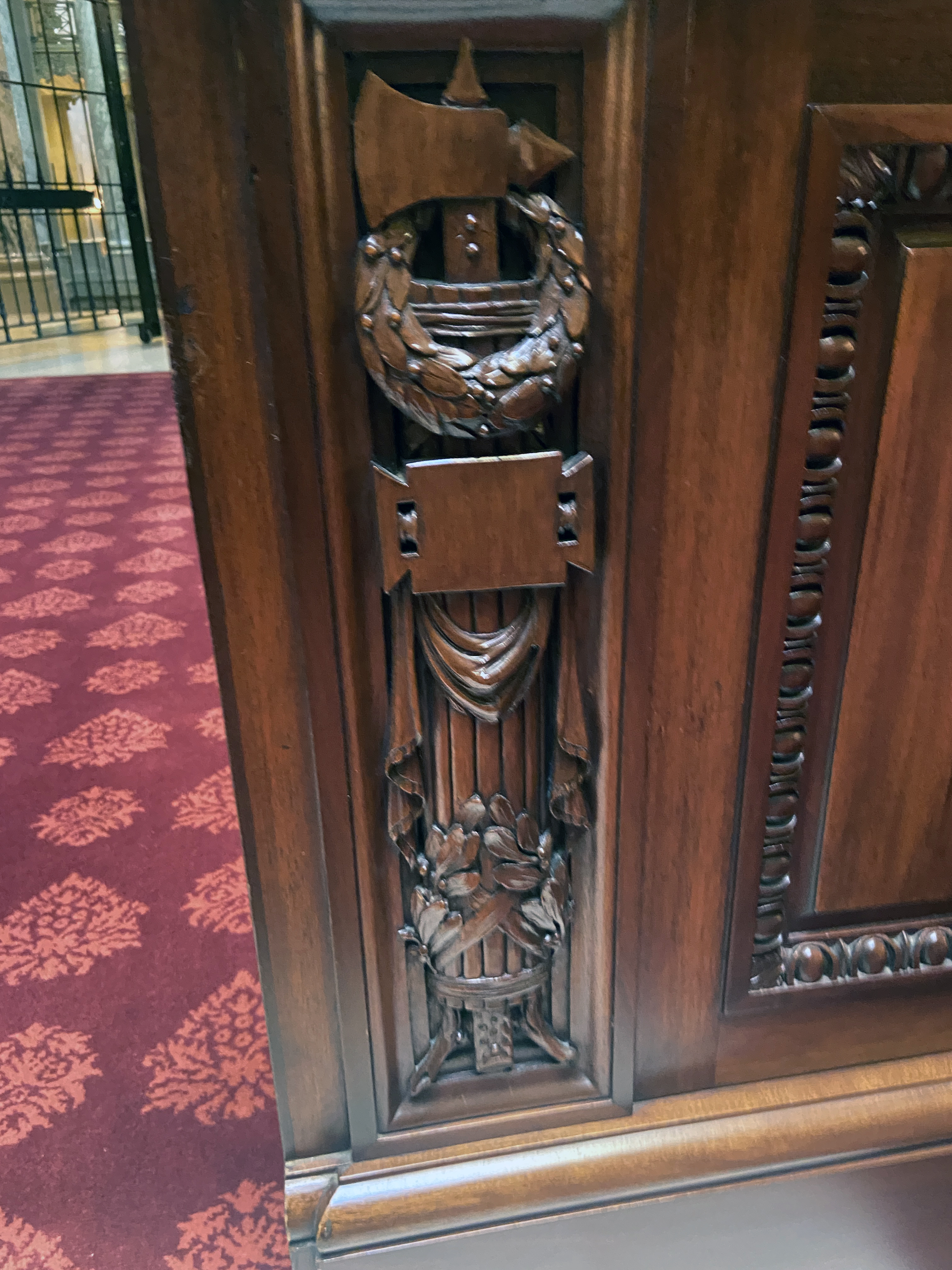
Ornate woodwork on railing in Minnesota Supreme Court Chamber

- The main entrance hallways in the Wisconsin State Capitol have lamps that are decorated with stone fasces motifs; in the woodwork before the podium of the speaker of the assembly, several double-bladed fasces are carved, and in the woodwork before the podium of the senate president are several single-bladed fasces.
- The grand seal of Harvard University inside Memorial Church is flanked by two inward-pointing fasces; the seal is located directly below the 368-foot (112 m) steeple and the Great Seal of the United States inside the Memorial Room; the walls of the room list the names of Harvard students, faculty, and alumni who gave their lives in service of the United States during World War I along with an empty tomb depicting Alma Mater holding a slain Harvard student.
- The fasces appears on the state seal of Colorado, US, beneath the "All-seeing eye" (or Eye of Providence) and above the mountains and mines.
- The hallmark of the Kerr & Co silver company was a fasces.
- On the seal of the New York City borough of Brooklyn, a figure carries a fasces; the seal appears on the borough flag; fasces also can be seen in the stone columns at Grand Army Plaza and on a flagpole in Washington Square Park.
- The symbol is used as part of the Knights of Columbus emblem (designed in 1883, replaced by a bayonet from 1926 to 1947).
- Commercially, a small fasces appeared at the top of one of the insignia of the Hupmobile automobile.
- A fasces appears on the statue of George Washington by Jean-Antoine Houdon that is now in the Virginia State Capitol; fasces are used as posts of the 1818 cast-iron fence surrounding the capitol building.
- Columns in the form of fasces line the entrance to Buffalo City Hall.
- In Newark Penn Station, the exit to Raymond Plaza West is bordered on both sides by 10-foot (3 m) vertical fasces (each with a double axe-head).
- VAW-116 have a fasces on their unit insignia.
- San Francisco's Coit Tower has two fasces-like insignia (without the axe) carved above its entrance, flanking a phoenix.
- Two monuments erected in Chicago at the time of the Century of Progress Exposition are adorned with fasces; the monument to Christopher Columbus (1933) in Grant Park has them on the ends of its exedra; the Balbo Monument in Burnham Park, (1934) a gift from Benito Mussolini, has the vandalized remains of fasces on all four corners of its plinth.

==== Examples of US fasces iconography ====
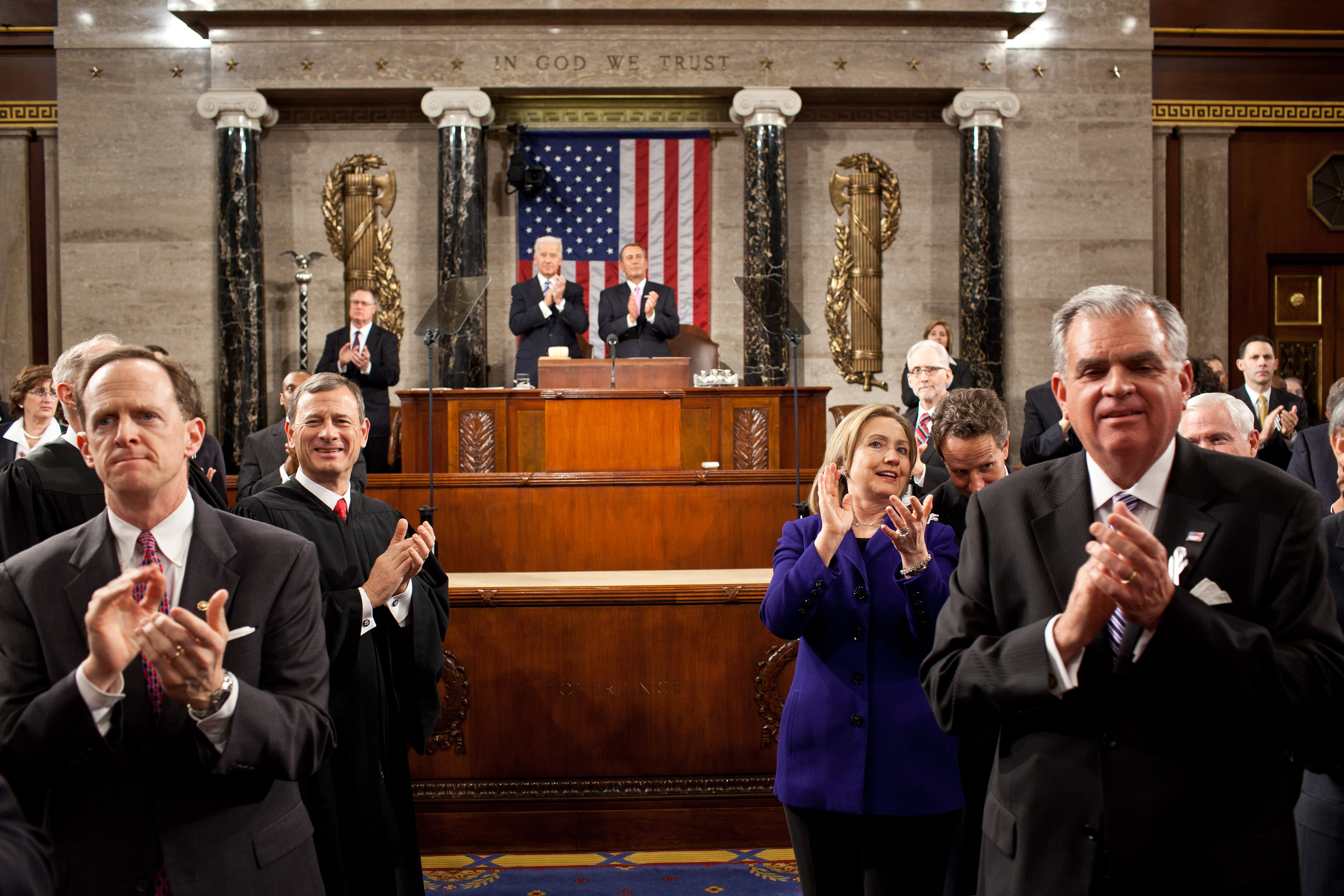
Fasces bestride Speaker's rostrum in the House chamber of the United States Capitol

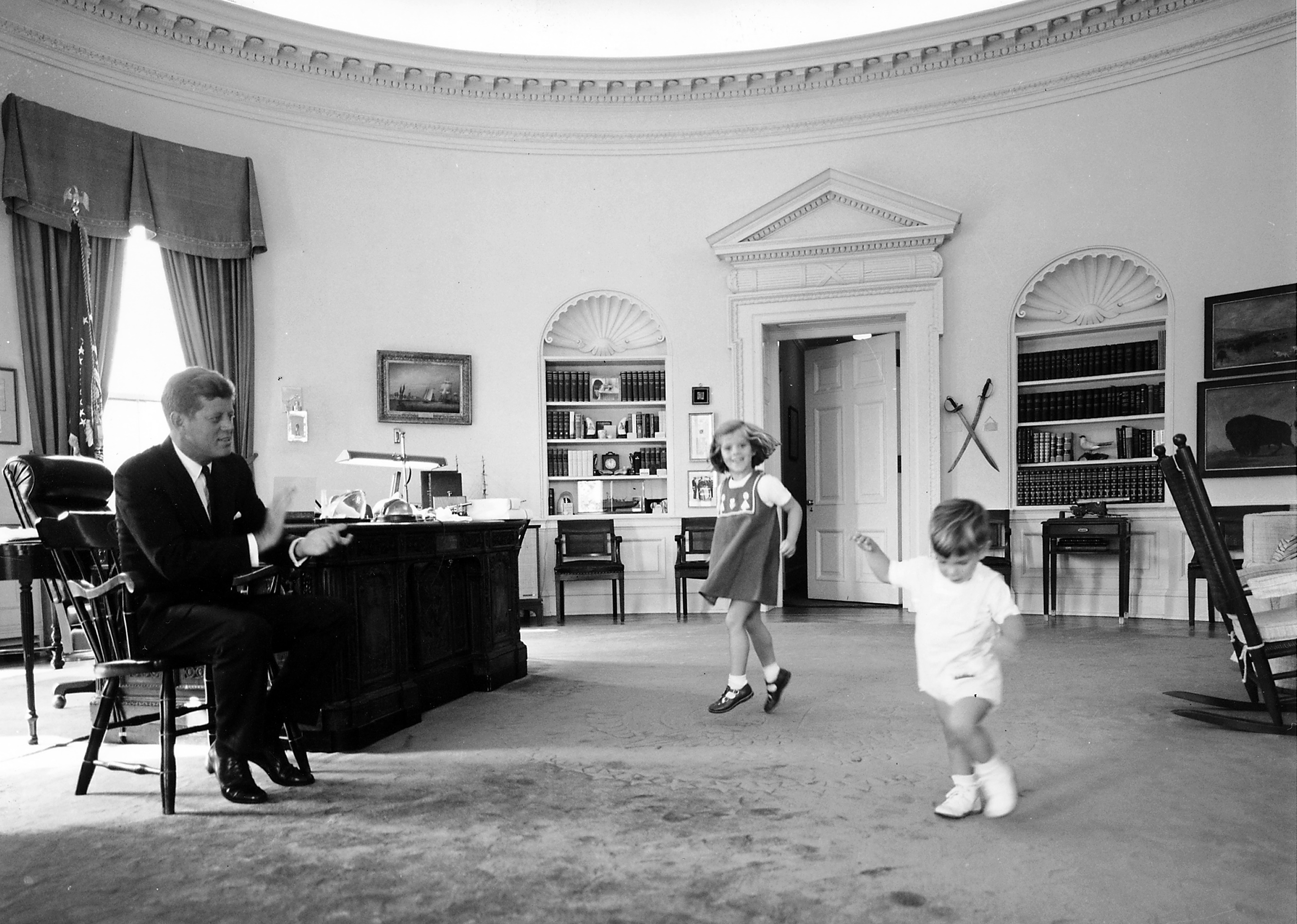
Above the door leading out of the Oval Office

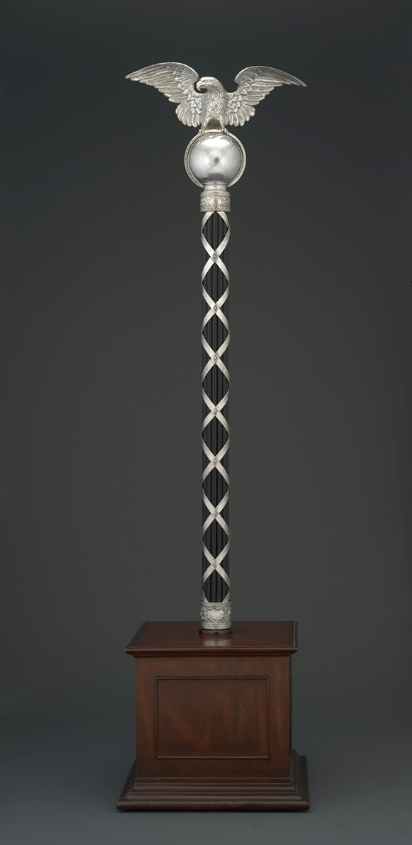
The mace of the United States House of Representatives, designed to resemble a fasces

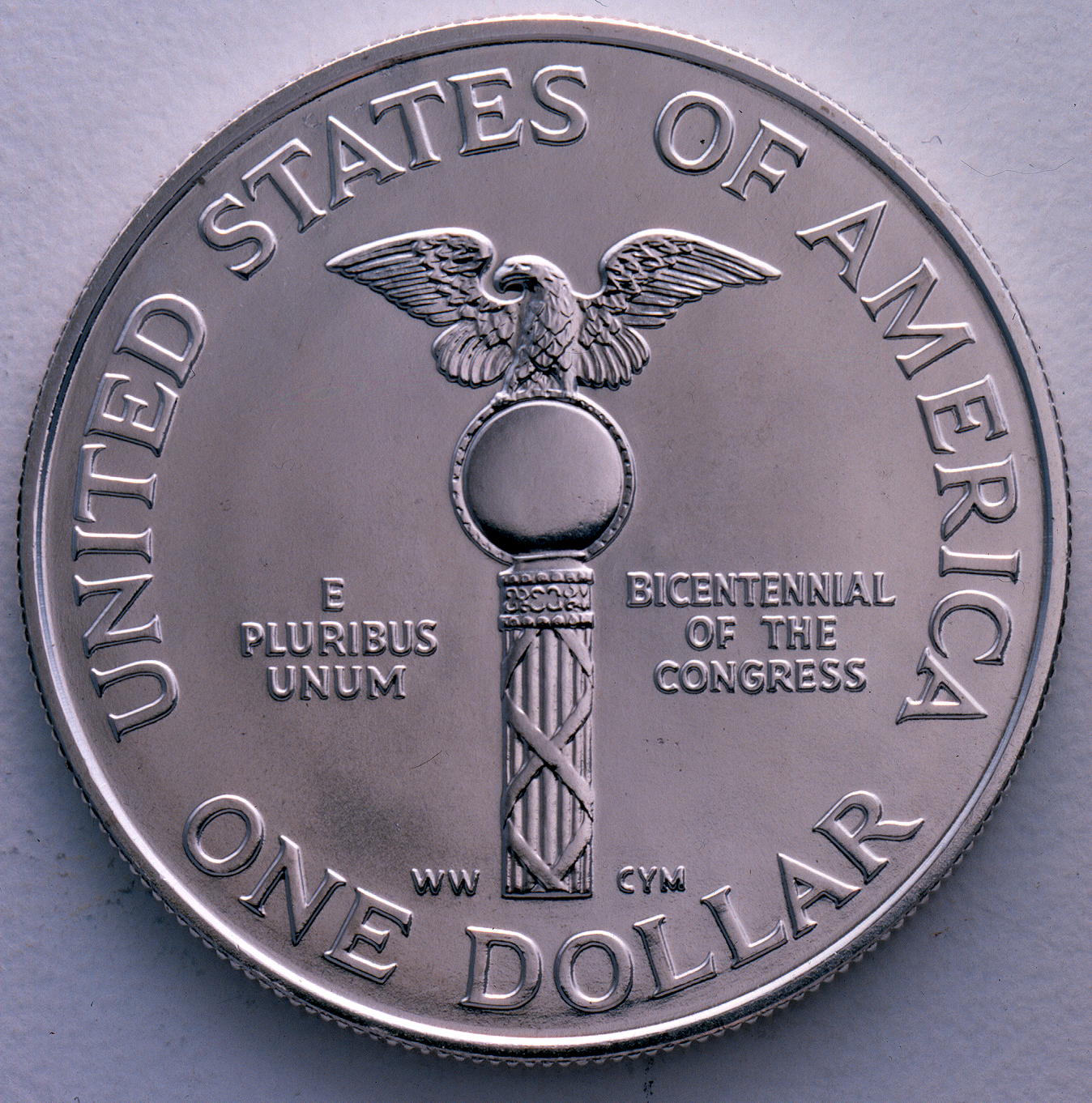
1989 US Congress Bicentennial commemorative coin reverse, depicting mace of the United States House of Representatives

The seal of the United States Tax Court

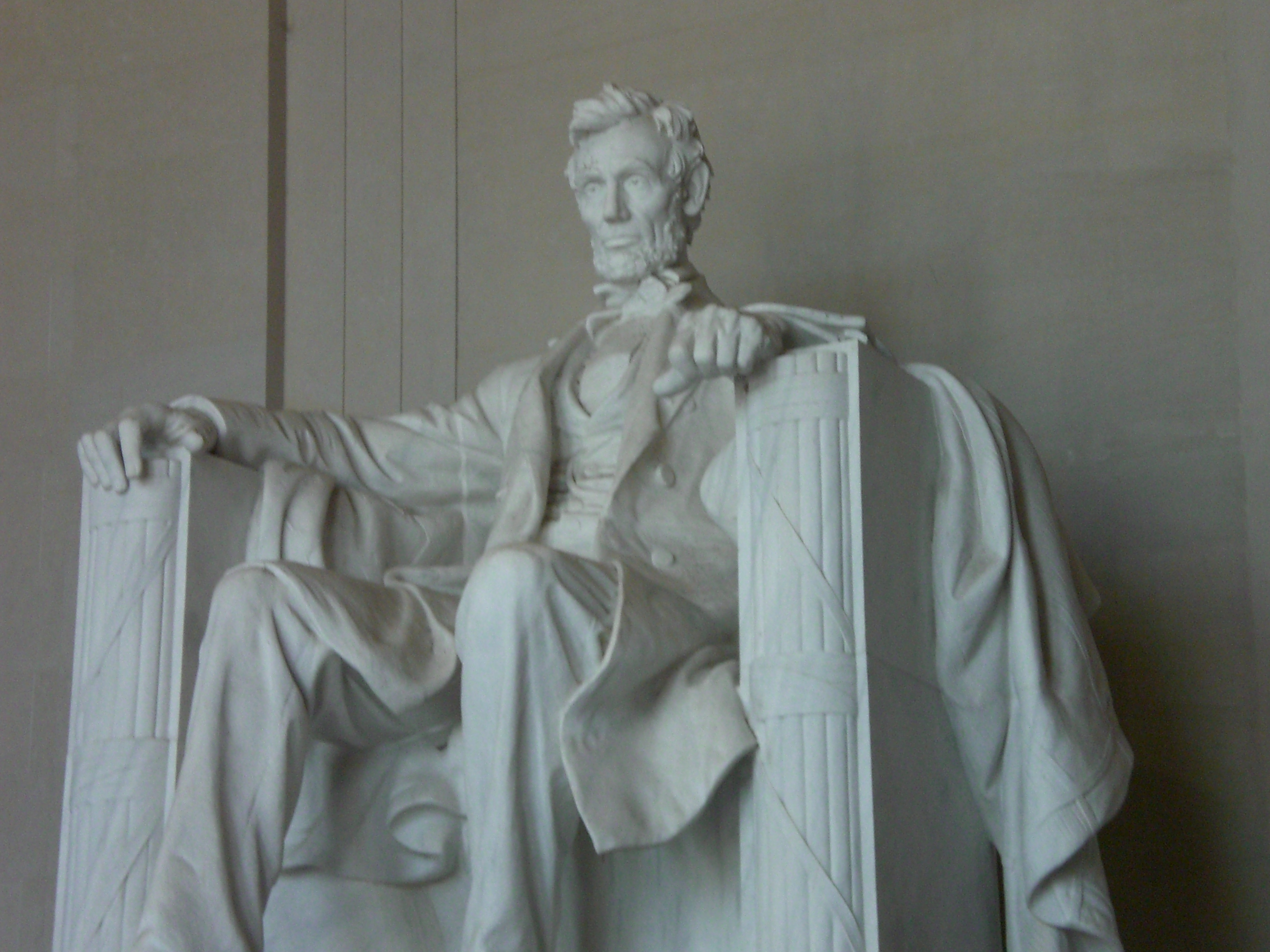
The Lincoln Memorial with the fronts of the chair arms shaped to resemble fasces

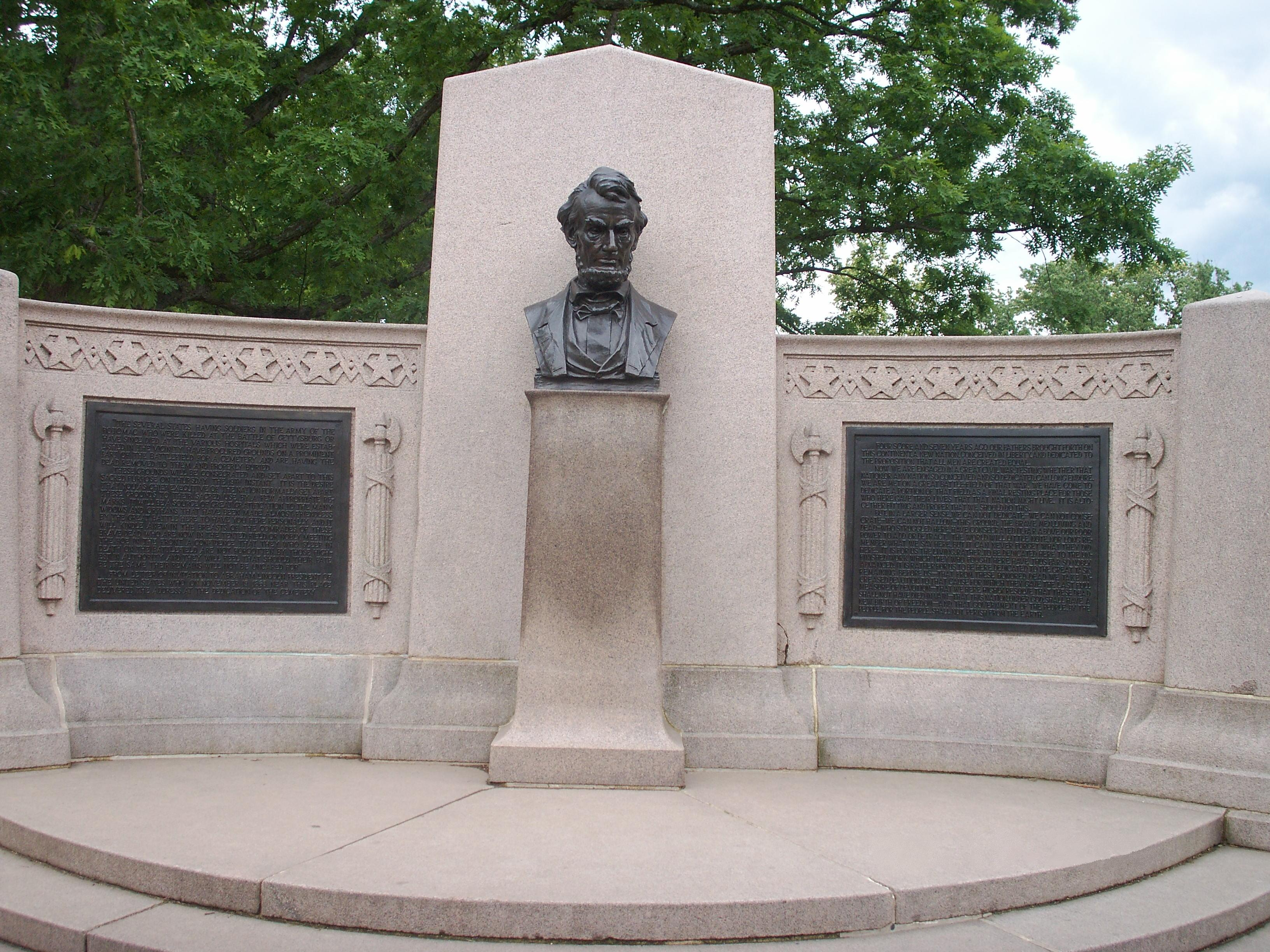
Flanking the image of Lincoln at the Gettysburg Address memorial

The seal of the Administrative Office of the United States Courts

Above the door to Chicago's City Hall

The flag of the New York City borough of Brooklyn

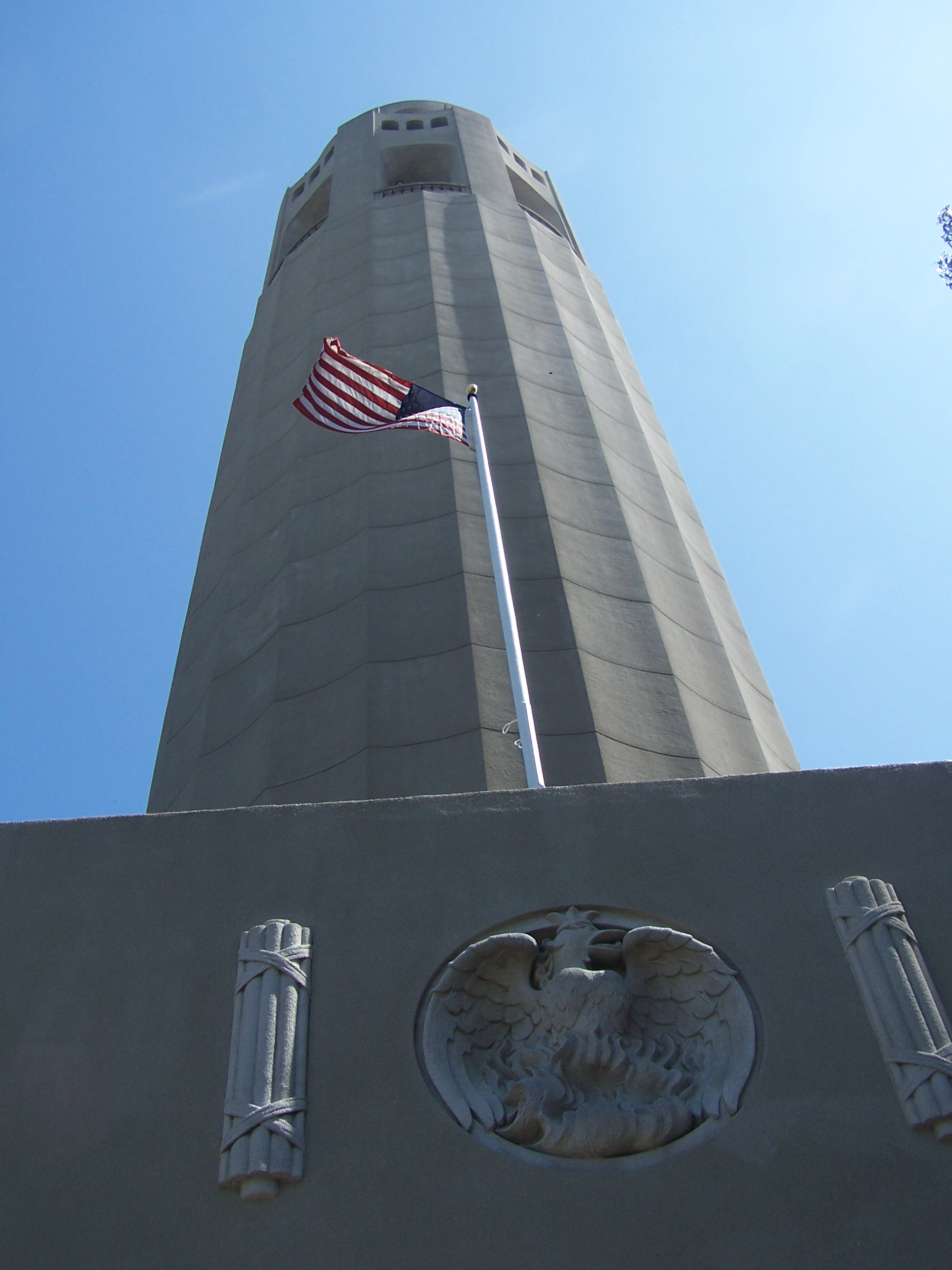
At the entrance to San Francisco's Coit Tower

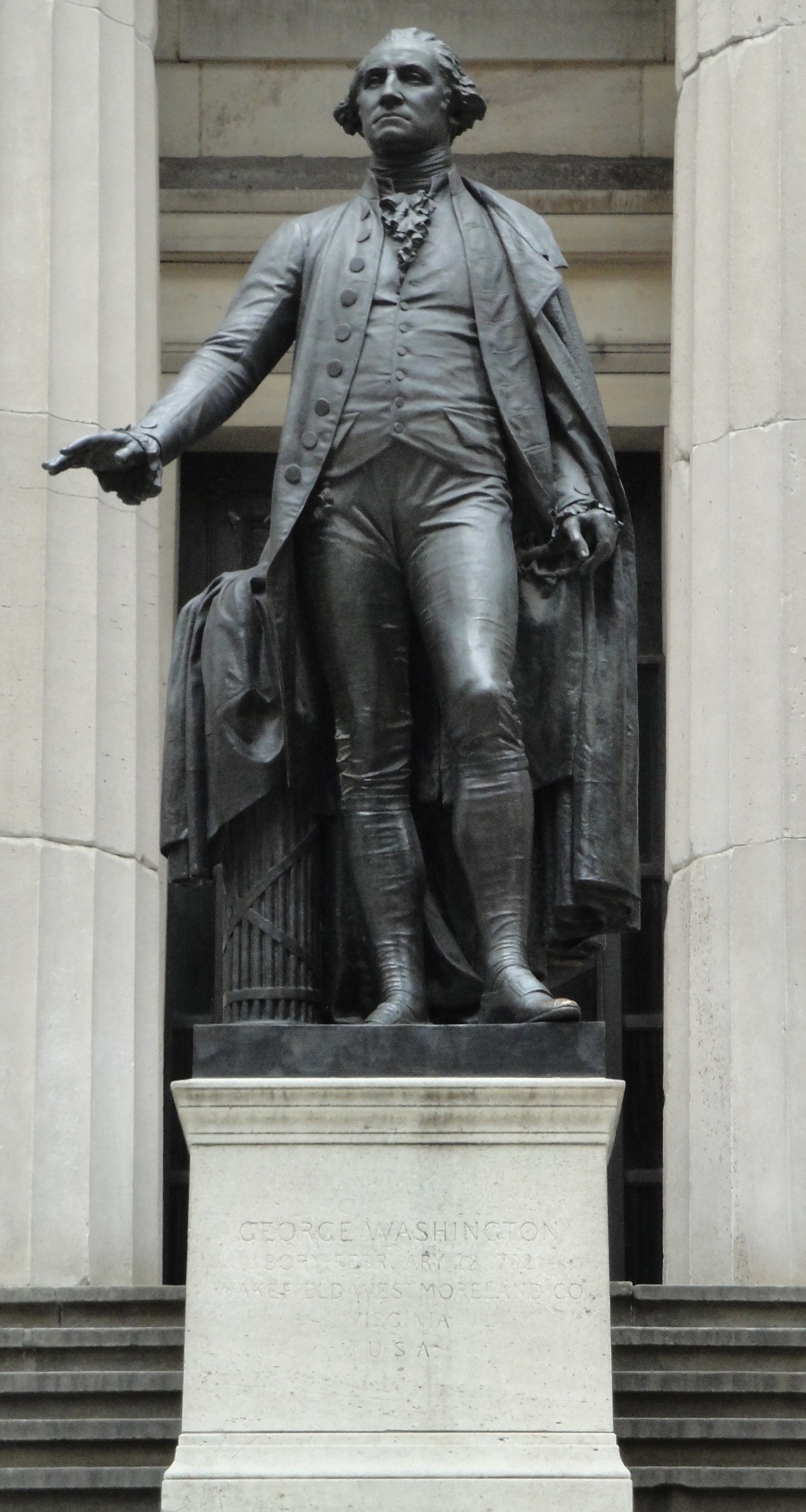
Statue of George Washington at the site of his inauguration as first president of the United States, now occupied by Federal Hall National Memorial, includes a fasces to the subject's rear right

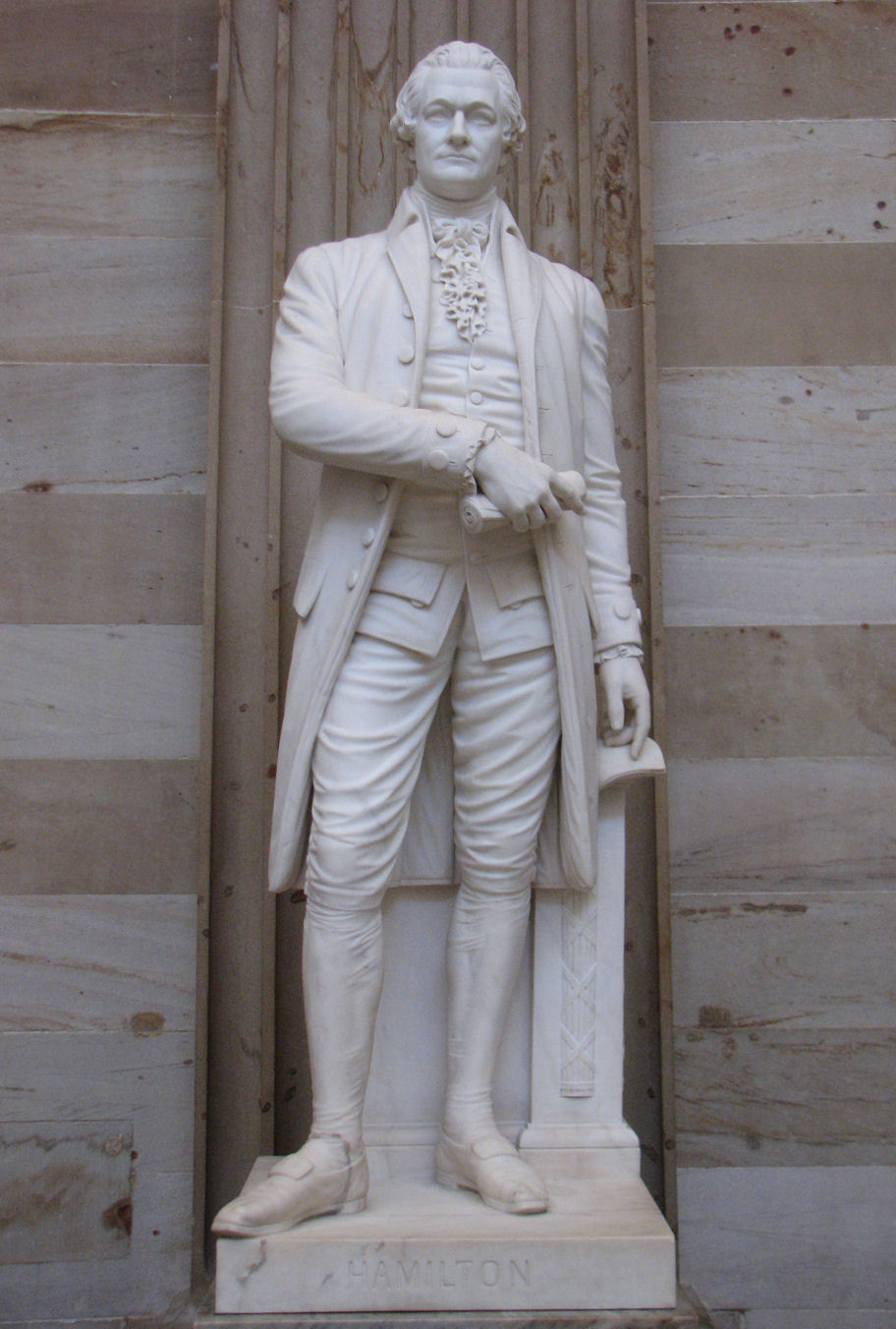
Horatio Stone's 1848 statue of Alexander Hamilton displays a fasces below Hamilton's hand

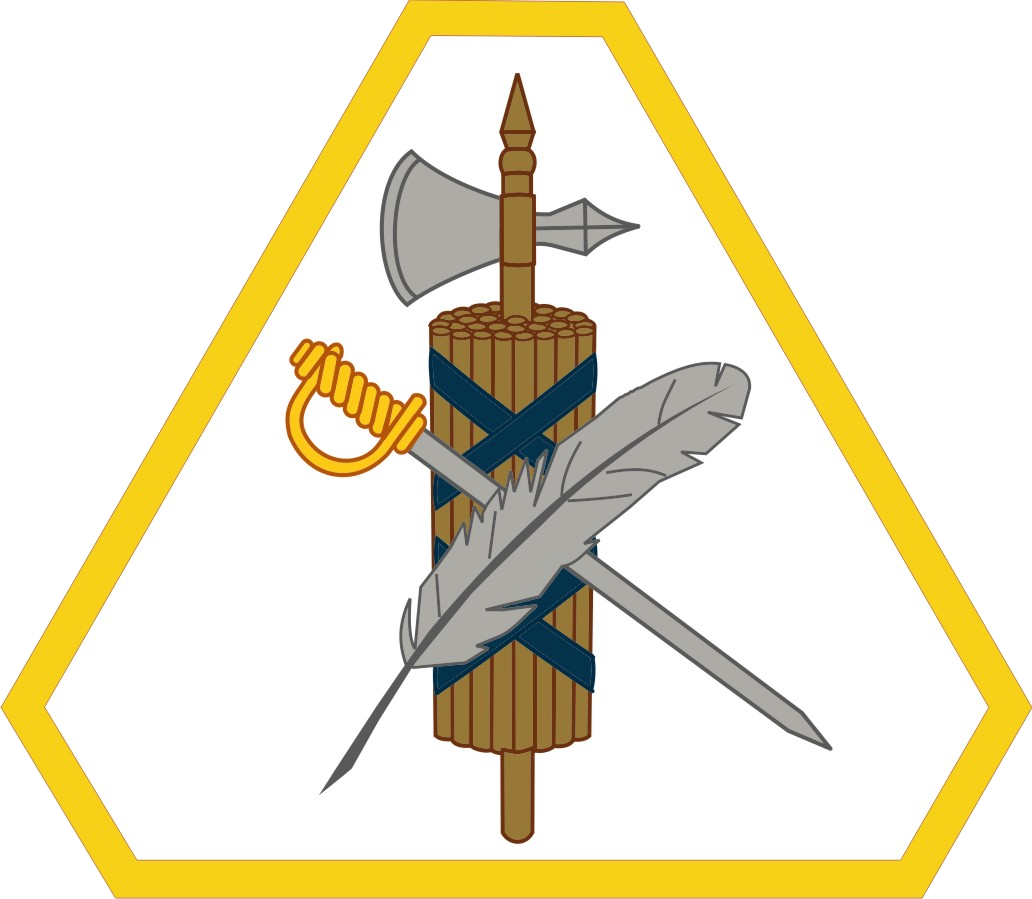
Shoulder sleeve insignia of US Army Reserve Legal Command

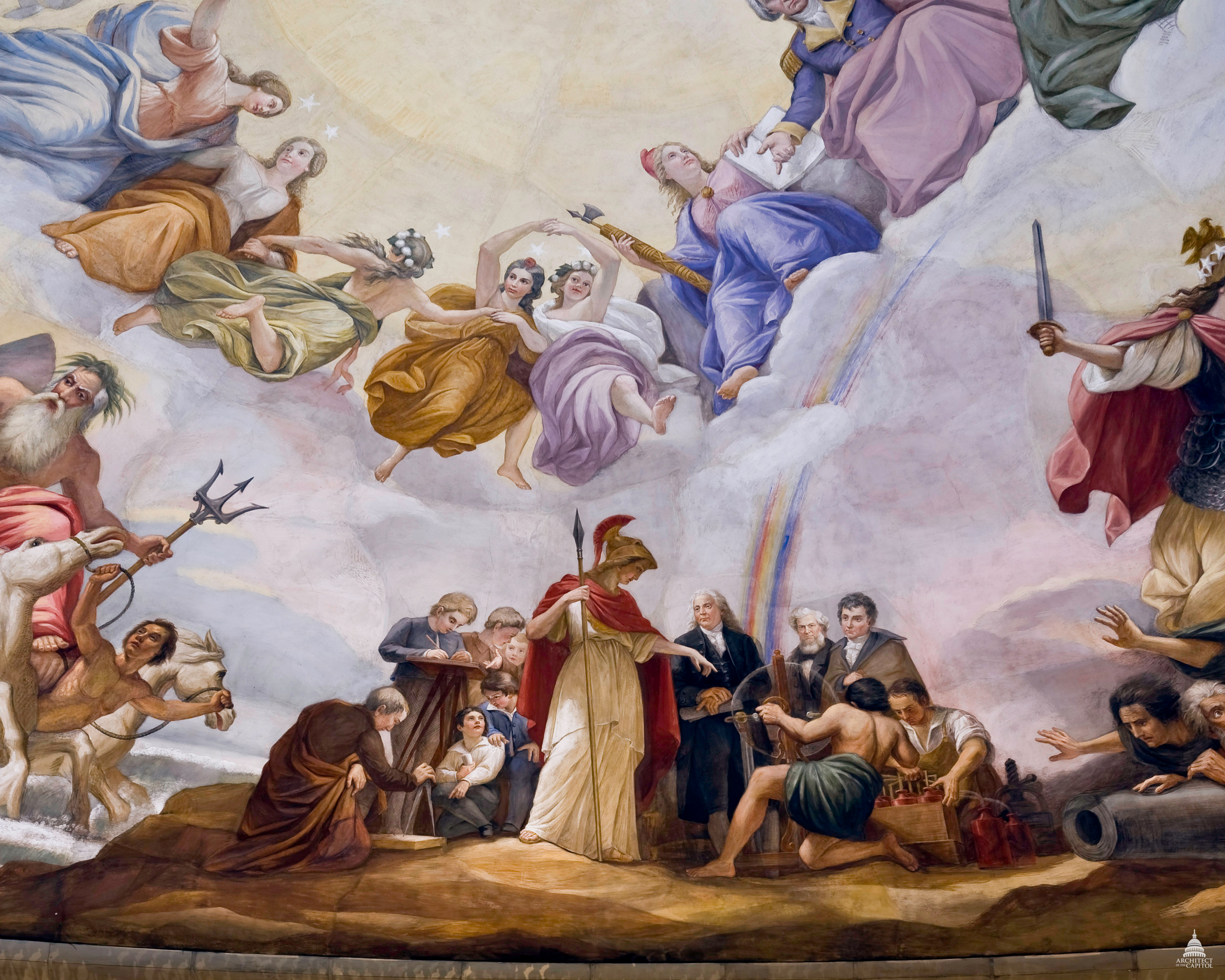
Portion of The Apotheosis of Washington, a fresco mural suspended above the rotunda of the United States Capitol Building

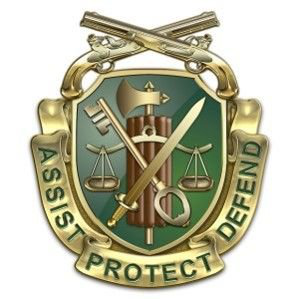
Regimental Insignia of the United States Military Police Corps.

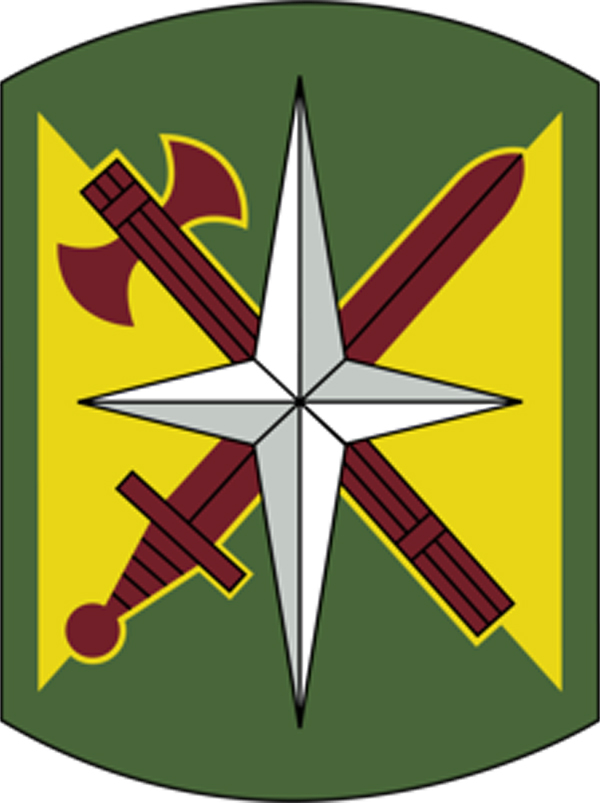
Shoulder sleeve insignia of the 14th Military Police Brigade

Shoulder sleeve insignia of the 18th Military Police Brigade

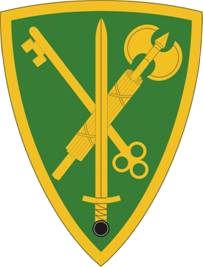
Shoulder sleeve insignia of the 42nd Military Police Brigade

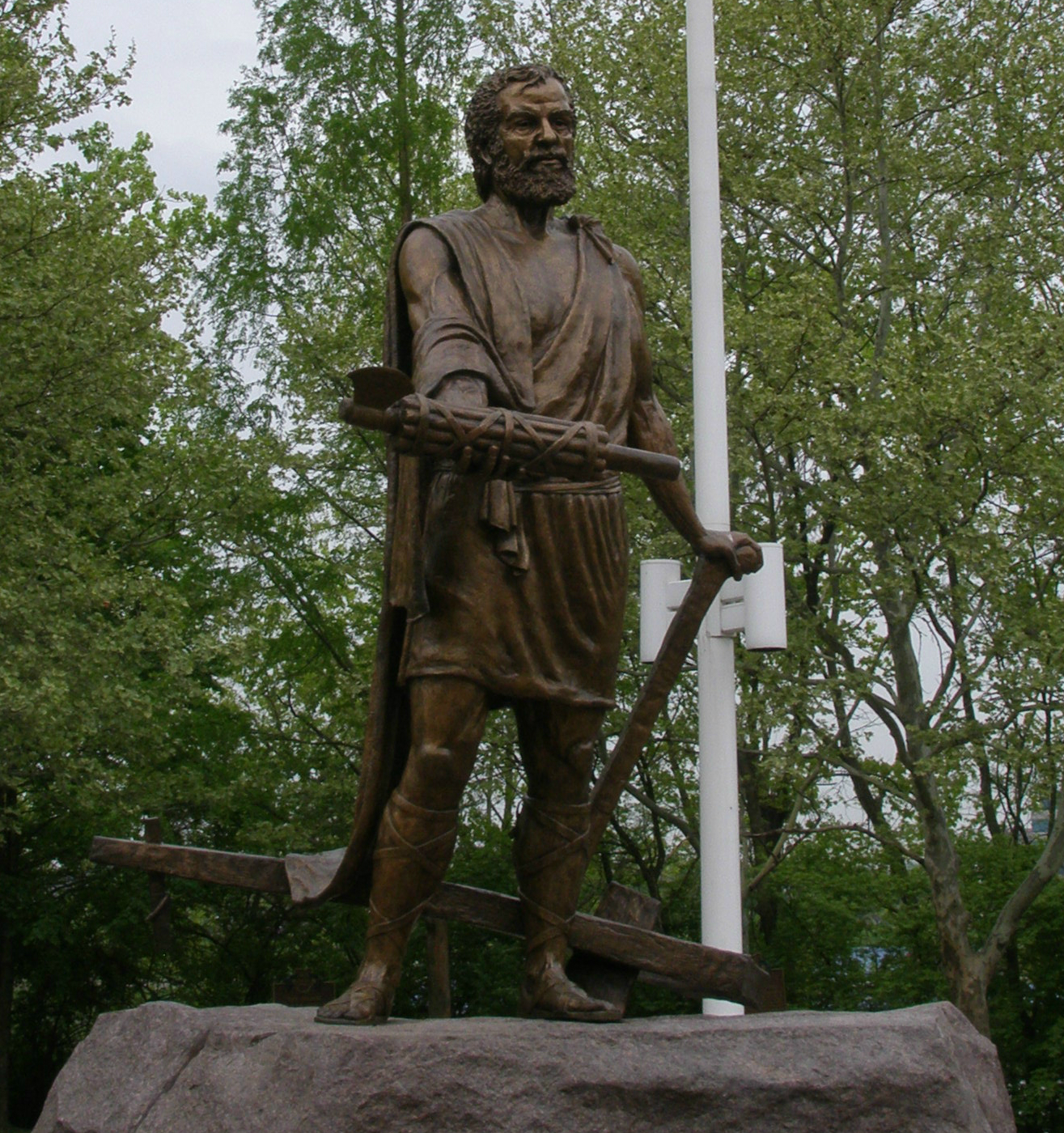
Statue of Lucius Quinctius Cincinnatus holding fasces

Seal of Carlsbad, California, which has a fasces on it

=== Modern authorities and movements ===
- The collar of the Latvian Order of the Three Stars is decorated with fasces that is supported by lion and griffin
- Benito Mussolini's tomb is flanked by marble fasces

The following cases involve the adoption of the fasces as a symbol or icon, although no physical re-introduction has occurred.

- Aiguillettes worn by aides-de-camp in many Commonwealth armed forces bear the fasces on the metal points; the origin of this is unknown, as the fasces is an uncommon symbol in British and Commonwealth heraldry and insignia
- The Miners Flag (also known as the "Diggers' Banner"), the standard of nineteenth-century gold-miners in the colony of Victoria, in Australia, included the fasces as a symbol of unity and strength of common purpose; this flag symbolized the movement prior to the rebellion at the Eureka Stockade (1854)
- The British Union of Fascists originally used the fasces on their flag until adopting the Flash and Circle
- The coat of arms of Ecuador, which also is featured on its national flag, has included a fasces since 1822
- The coat of arms of Cameroon features two fasces that form a diagonal cross
- The coat of arms of Cuba features a fasces
- The third flag of Gran Colombia, a former nation in South America, depicted a large fasces entwined with several arrows
- The coat of arms of Norte de Santander, a department of Colombia, and of its capital Cúcuta, both feature a fasces
- The coat of arms of the Romanian Police features two crossed fasces
- The Grand Coat of Arms of Vilnius, Lithuania features a fasces
- The crests of many collegiate fraternities and sororities feature the fasces, including those of Chi Phi, Alpha Phi Delta, Sigma Alpha Mu, Phi Beta Sigma, and Psi Upsilon
- The academic seal of American University Washington College of Law prominently features a fasces
- The symbol of the National Party (Uruguay) (Partido Nacional) includes a fasces
- On the entrance of the Royal Castle of Laeken in Belgium
- The emblem of the Spanish gendarmerie Guardia Civil includes a fasces
- Both the Norwegian and Swedish police have double fasces in their coats of arms
- The emblems of the Russian Federal Penitentiary Service and Federal Bailiffs Service include fasces in the double-headed eagle's left foot
- Insignia of the now-disbanded Philippine Constabulary included a fasces
- Seal of the Executive Secretary of the Philippines includes a fasces in the merlion's paw
- The coat of arms of the Batavian Republic features a fasces
- Both the logo and flag of Patriot Front feature a fasces.
- The emblem of the National Assembly of the Central African Republic features a fasces in the foreground.
The coat of arms of the Swiss canton of St. Gallen has displayed the fasces since 1803.

Greater coat of arms of Italy of 1929–1943, during the Fascist era, bearing the fasces

The original flag of the British Union of Fascists

An alternate flag of the British Union of Fascists

Emblem of the Guardia Civil, a law enforcement agency from Spain

The Grand Coat of Arms of Vilnius, Lithuania, bearing the fasces

The emblem of the Russian Federal Penitentiary Service, bearing the fasces

The emblem of the Russian Federal Bailiffs Service, bearing the fasces

Insignia of the Philippine Constabulary, bearing the fasces

Seal of the Office of the Executive Secretary (Philippines)

Dutch Maiden, the national symbol of the Batavian Republic, bearing the fasces

Coat of arms of the Swedish Police Authority

Coat of arms of the Norwegian Police Service

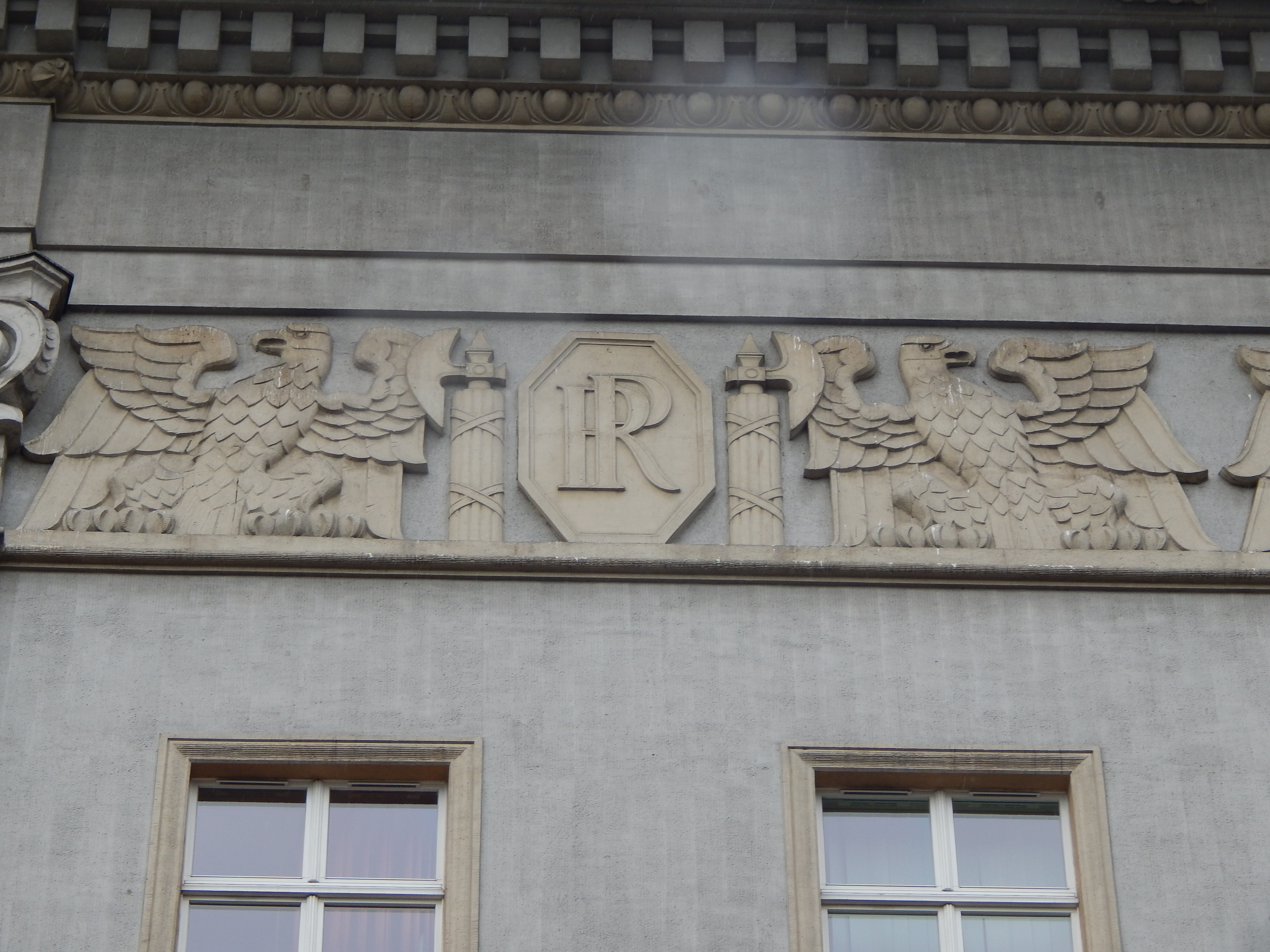
Fragment of the façade of the building of the Silesian Parliament in Katowice

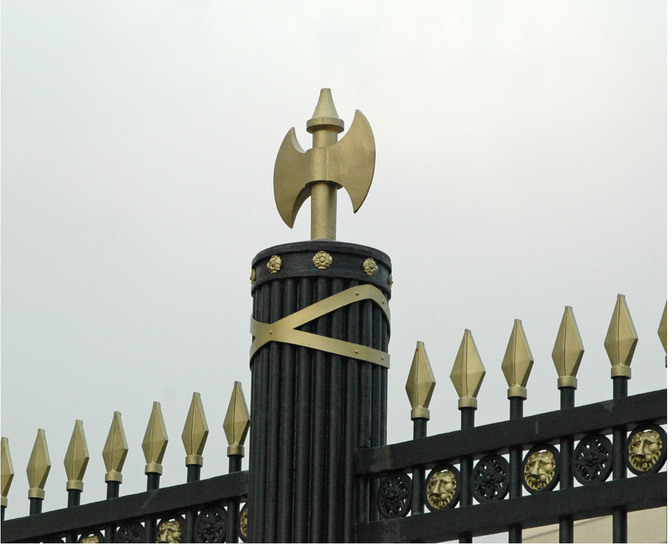
Fasces on railings at Alexander Garden in Moscow

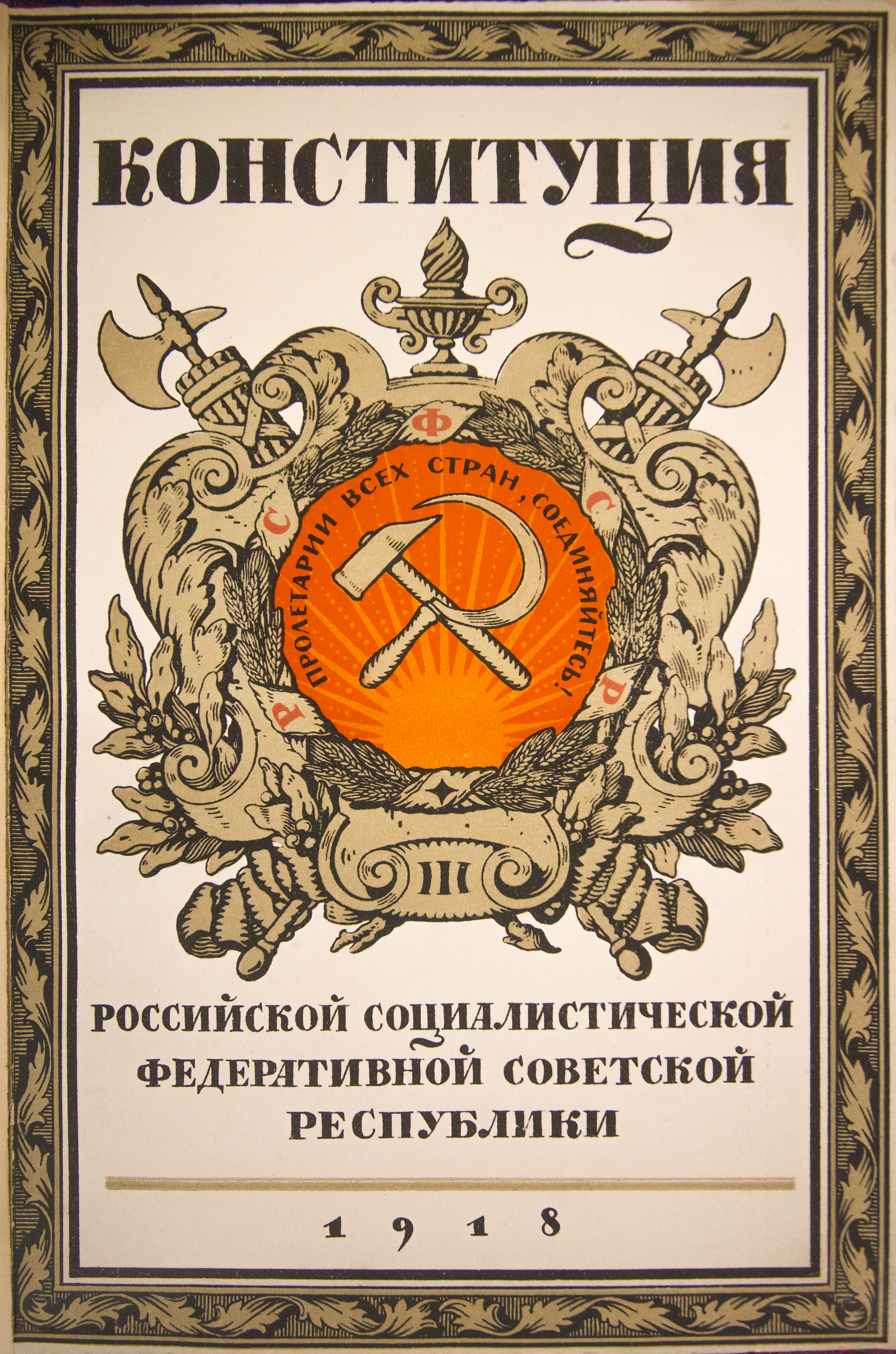
Cover of the Soviet Russia Constitution of 1918

== See also ==
- Fascine (bundle of wood or other material used in earthworks)
- Papal ferula
- Obol – a unit of Ancient Greek currency, originally represented through a bundle of rods before being replaced with a coin of the same name
- Francisca
- Labrys
- Law and order (politics)
- Staff of office
- Yoke and arrows
- 1107 Lictoria
- The Bundle of Sticks – an Aesop's Fable whose moral is that there is strength in unity
