= 14th Military Police Brigade =

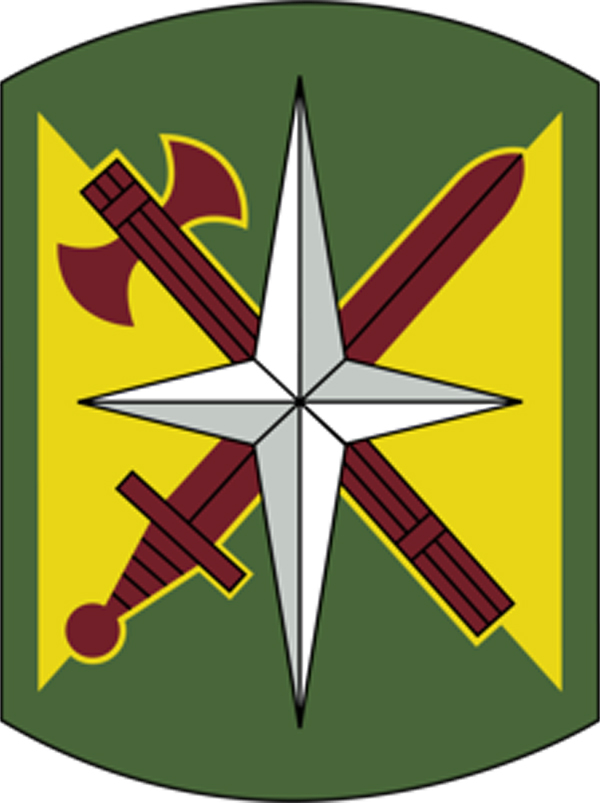
- Shoulder Sleeve Insignia
- Active: 1965 - present
- Country: United States
- Branch: United States Army
- Type: Active duty
- Role: Military Police
- Size: Brigade
- Part of: U.S. Army Military Police School
- Garrison/HQ: Fort Leonard Wood
- Decorations: Meritorious Unit Commendation
- Website: https://home.army.mil/wood/units-tenants/USAMPS/MPOrganizations/14th-military-police-brigade

Commanders
- Current commander: Col. Samuel Meyer
- Command Sergeant Major: CSM Gregory A. Elderkin

Insignia
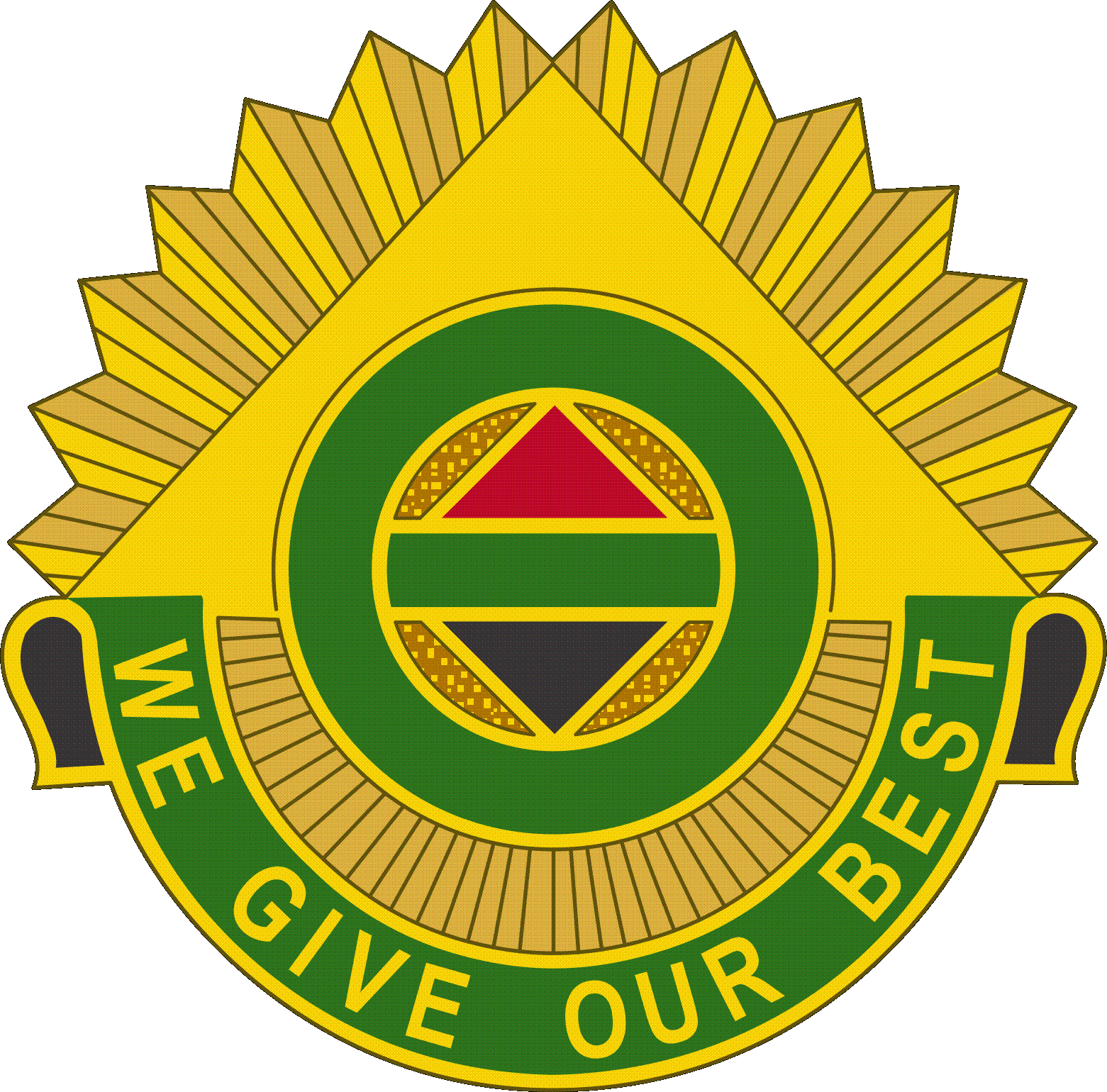
- Distinctive Unit Insignia

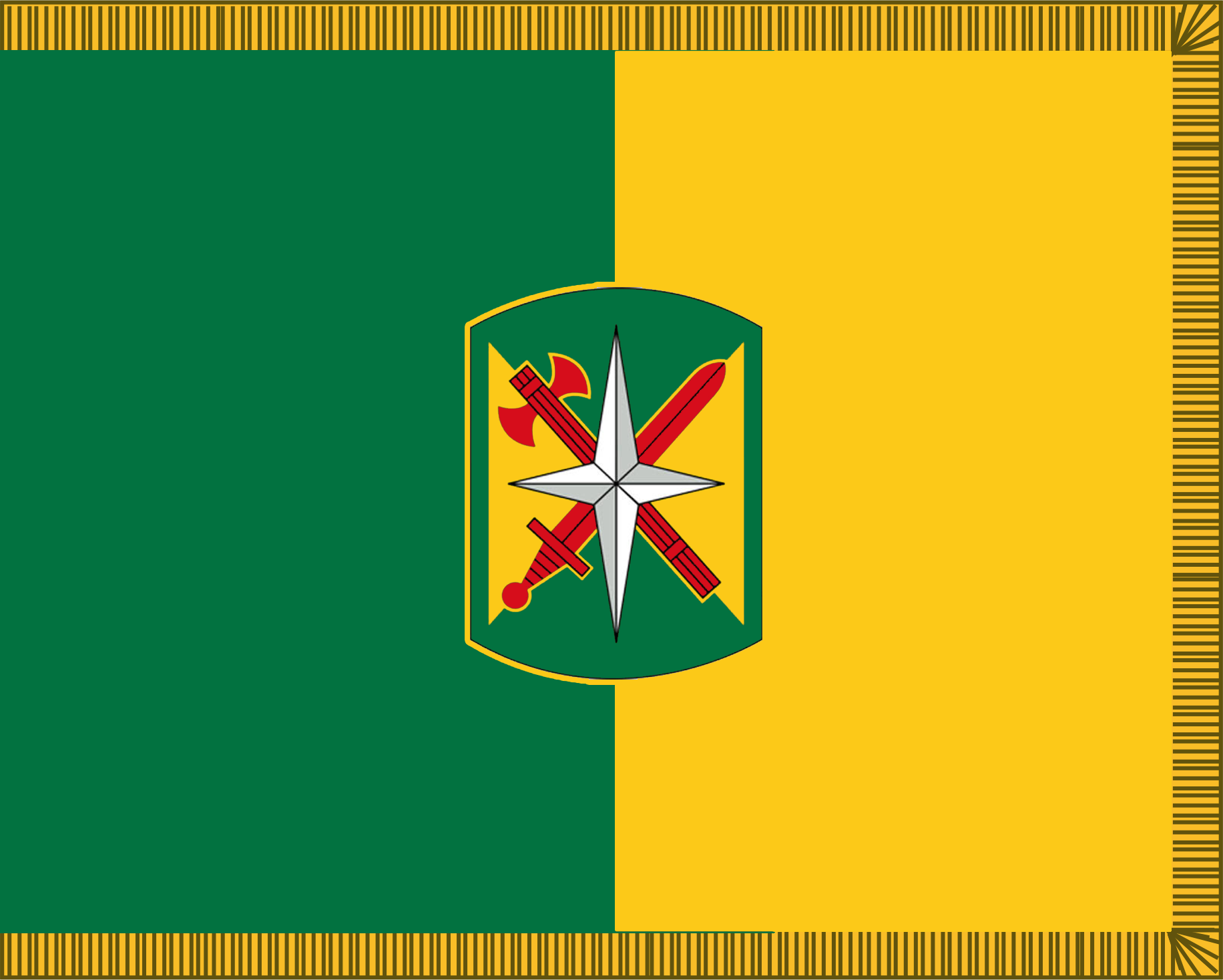
- 14th Military Police Brigade Flag

The 14th Military Police Brigade is a military police unit stationed at Fort Leonard Wood, in Missouri. The 14th Military Police Brigade provides the Army with Soldiers, DA Civilians, and leaders of character who provide the basic and advanced skills required to execute policing, detention, and security mobility support across the range of military operations.

== Organization ==
HHC 14th Military Police Brigade

701st Military Police Battalion

787th Military Police Battalion

795th Military Police Battalion

== History ==
The 14th Military Police Brigade was first activated as the 14th Military Police Group in Mannheim, Germany on 25 June 1965. The group was reorganized 10 June 1968 at Fort Meade, Maryland to provide support to the nation's capital until it was reactivated and returned to Germany at Moehringen, Germany on 16 November 1981. It was reorganized and redesignated as the 14th Military Police Brigade on 16 August 1985 at Wilkin Kaserne, Kornwestheim, Germany.

The brigade, composed of the Headquarters and Headquarters Company, the 385th Military Police Battalion in Kornwestheim, and the 793rd Military Police Battalion in Nurnberg, supported VII (US) Corps. It conducted rear combat operations, battlefield circulation control, prisoner of war operations and wartime law enforcement. The brigade also provided trained military police for peacetime force protection in the thirteen military communities of the VII (US) Corps. The brigade deployed with one battalion to Saudi Arabia in December 1990 in support of Operation Desert Shield while its remaining units provided security for the soldiers and families left in Germany. When Operation Desert Storm commenced in January 1991, the brigade commanded 21 units of active and reserve forces – 2,800 soldiers – until redeployed in May 1991. It was then inactivated at Kornwestheim, Germany on 17 March 1992 and reorganized at Mannheim, Germany on 18 March 1992 as the command and control headquarters for the 95th and 97th Military Police Battalions.

Due to further reorganizing, the DOD determined there would be only one MP Brigade in Germany, to be stationed in Mannheim. In the fall of 1994 the 14th MP Brigade received word that it would be deactivated. The 18th MP Brigade was relocated to Mannheim, while the 14th was deactivated for five years, being reactivated in 1999.

The 14th Military Police Brigade was later inactivated on 15 September 1994 at Mannheim, Germany. On 1 October 1999, as part of the move of the Military Police Corps Regiment from Fort McClellan, Alabama the brigade was reactivated at Fort Leonard Wood, Missouri.

== Lineage and honors ==
HEADQUARTERS 14th MILITARY POLICE BRIGADE

Constituted 24 June 1965 in the Regular Army as Headquarters and Headquarters Detachment, 14th Military Police Group

Activated 25 June 1965 in Germany

Inactivated 20 June 1972 at Fort George G. Meade, Maryland

Redesignated 16 November 1981 as Headquarters and Headquarters Company, 14th Military Police Group, and concurrently activated in Germany

Reorganized and redesignated 16 August 1985 as Headquarters and Headquarters Company, 14th Military Police Brigade

Inactivated 15 September 1994 in Germany

Headquarters transferred 1 October 1999 to the U.S. Army Training and Doctrine Command and activated at Fort Leonard Wood, Missouri

== Campaign participation credit ==
Southwest Asia Defense of Saudi Arabia Liberation and Defense of Kuwait Cease-Fire

== Awards ==
Streamer embroidered SOUTHWEST ASIA 1990–1991
