= Selina Hastings =

Selina Hastings is the name of:

- Selina Hastings, Countess of Huntingdon (1707–1791) British religious leader connected to the Methodist movement
- Selina Hastings (writer) (born 1945), British journalist, author and biographer
