= Francis Huntingdon =

Francis Huntingdon may refer to:

- Francis Hastings, 2nd Earl of Huntingdon (1514–1561), son of the 1st Earl of Huntingdon and Anne Stafford, mistress of Henry VIII
- Francis Hastings, 10th Earl of Huntingdon (1729–1789), British peer; son of the 9th Earl of Huntingdon and his wife, Selina
- Francis Hastings, 16th Earl of Huntingdon (1901–1990), British artist, academic and Labour politician
