= Ashby-de-la-Zouch =

Market town and civil parish in Leicestershire, England

Coordinates: 52.746°N 1.476°W

- Town and civil parish
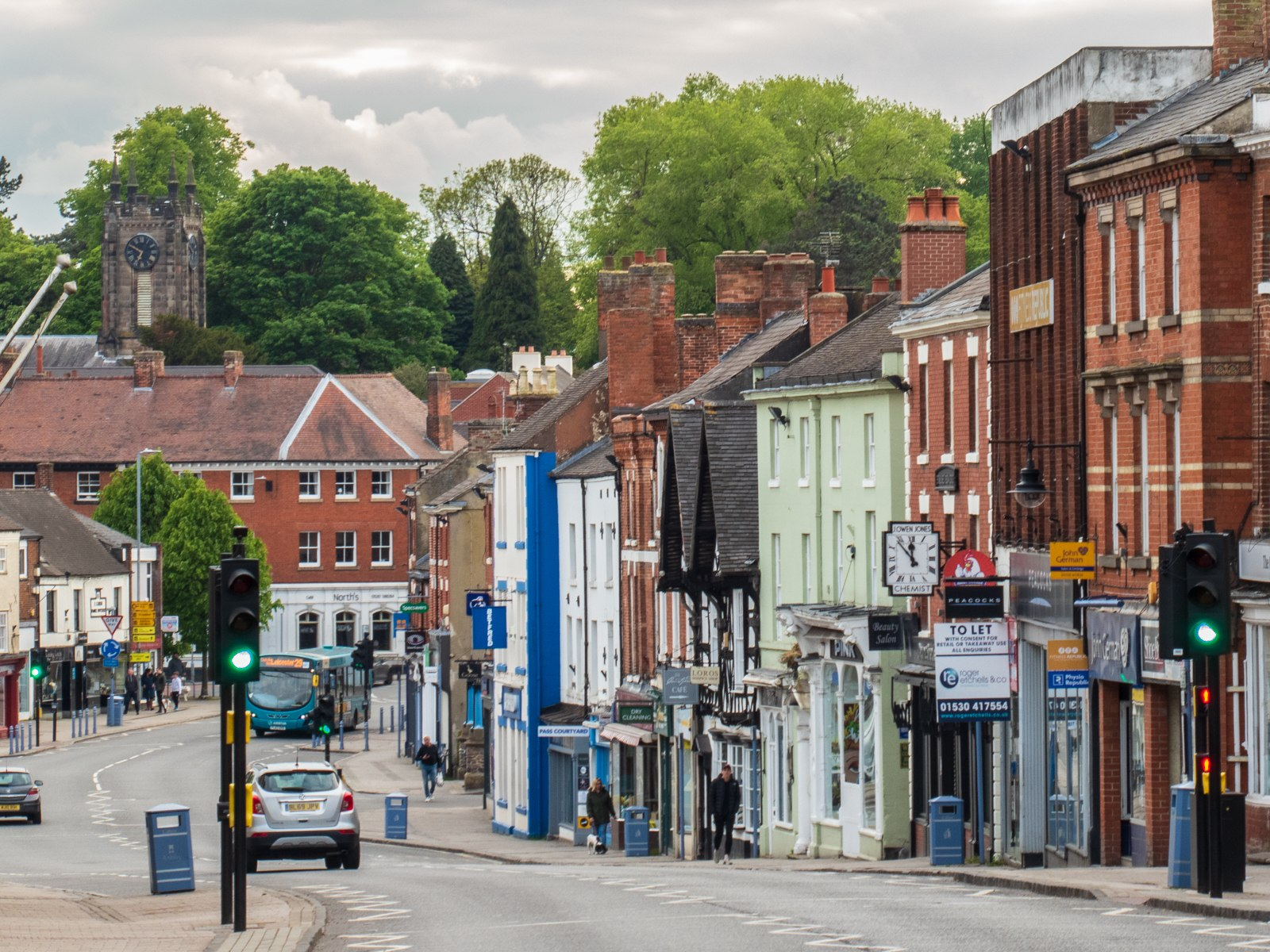
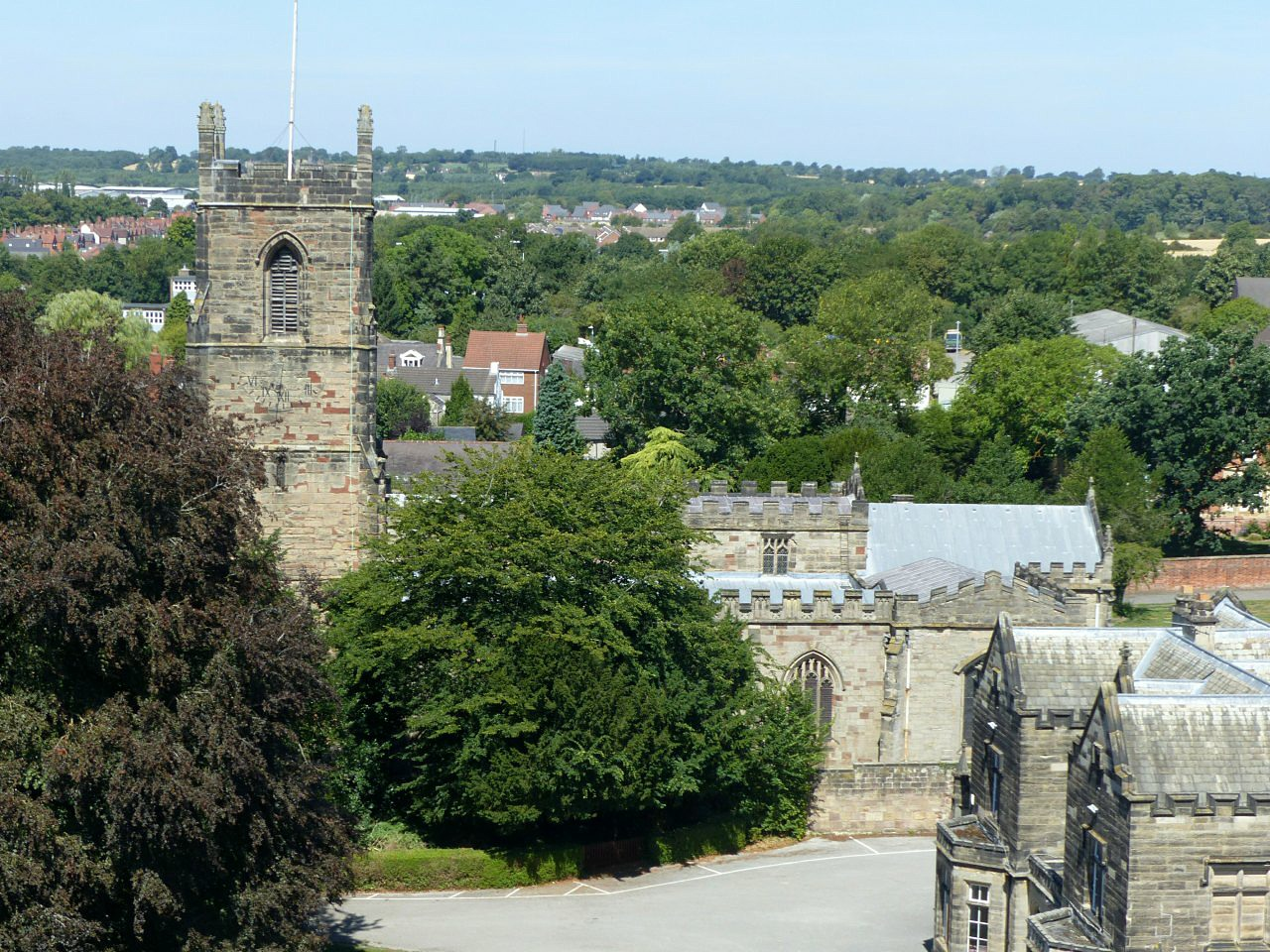
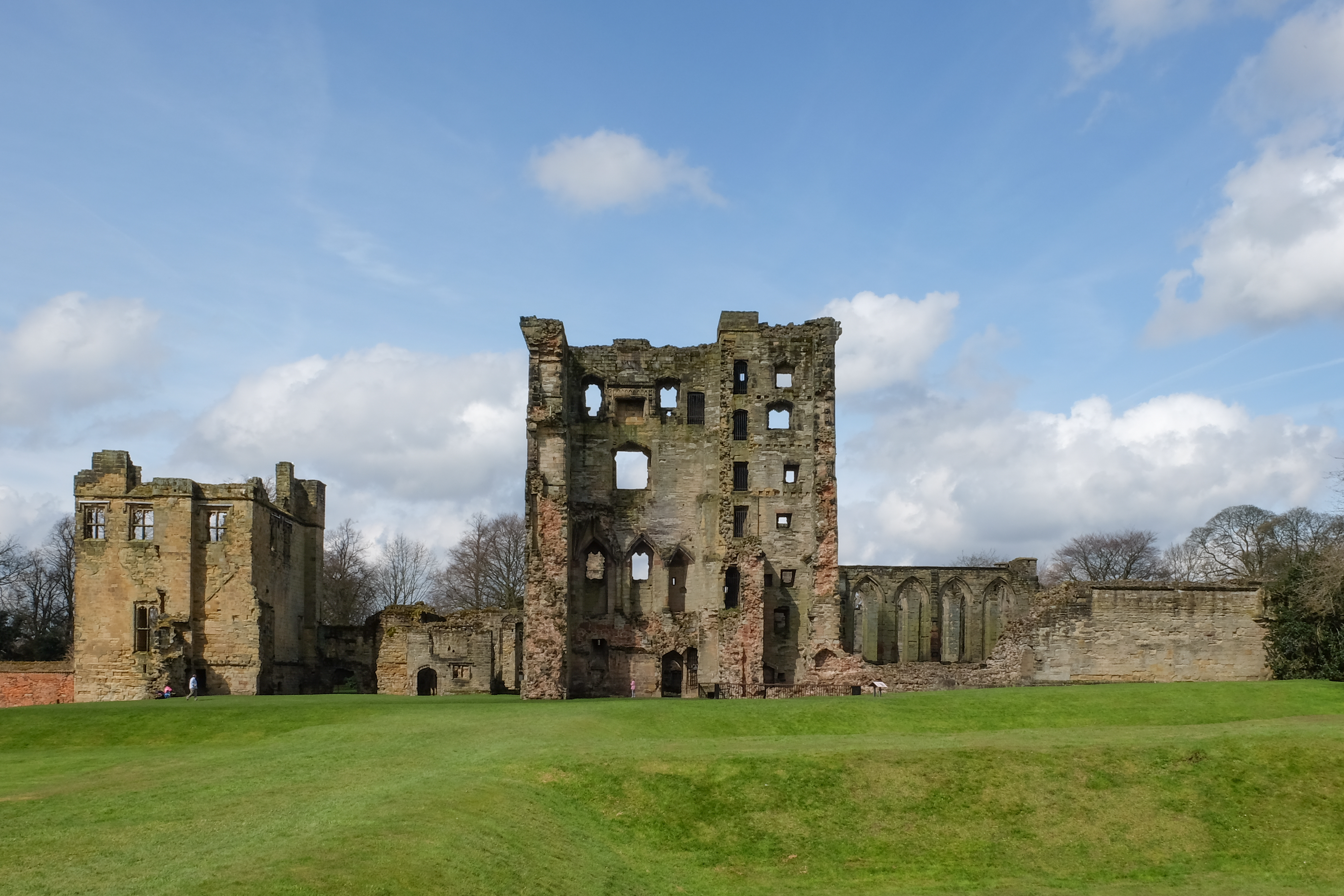
- Market Street St Helen's Church Castle

- Location within Leicestershire
- Population: 15,120 (2021 Census)
- OS grid reference: SK3516
  - London: 115 SE
- Civil parish: Ashby de la Zouch
- District: North West Leicestershire
- Shire county: Leicestershire
- Region: East Midlands
- Country: England
- Sovereign state: United Kingdom
- Areas of the town: List: Castle; Holywell; Ivanhoe; Money Hill; Willesley
- Post town: Ashby-de-la-Zouch
- Postcode district: LE65
- Dialling code: 01530
- Police: Leicestershire
- Fire: Leicestershire
- Ambulance: East Midlands
- UK Parliament: North West Leicestershire
- Website: Ashby de la Zouch Town Council

Ashby-de-la-Zouch (/ˈæʃbi də lə ˈzuːʃ/), also spelled Ashby de la Zouch (Note: So spelled officially "Town of Ashby de la Zouch". North West Leicestershire District Council.) and commonly shortened to Ashby, is a market town and civil parish in the North West Leicestershire district of Leicestershire, England, near to the Derbyshire and Staffordshire borders. Its population at the 2021 census was 16,491. Ashby de la Zouch Castle was an important fort in the 15th to 17th centuries. During the 19th century, the town's main industry was ribbon manufacturing.

The civil parish includes the hamlets of Shellbrook to the west and Boundary to the north-west. Swadlincote, Burton upon Trent, Melbourne and Coalville are within 10 miles (16 km), with Derby 12 miles (19 km) due north. It lies at the heart of the National Forest, 24 miles (39 km) south of the Peak District National Park, on the A42 between Tamworth and Nottingham.

== History ==
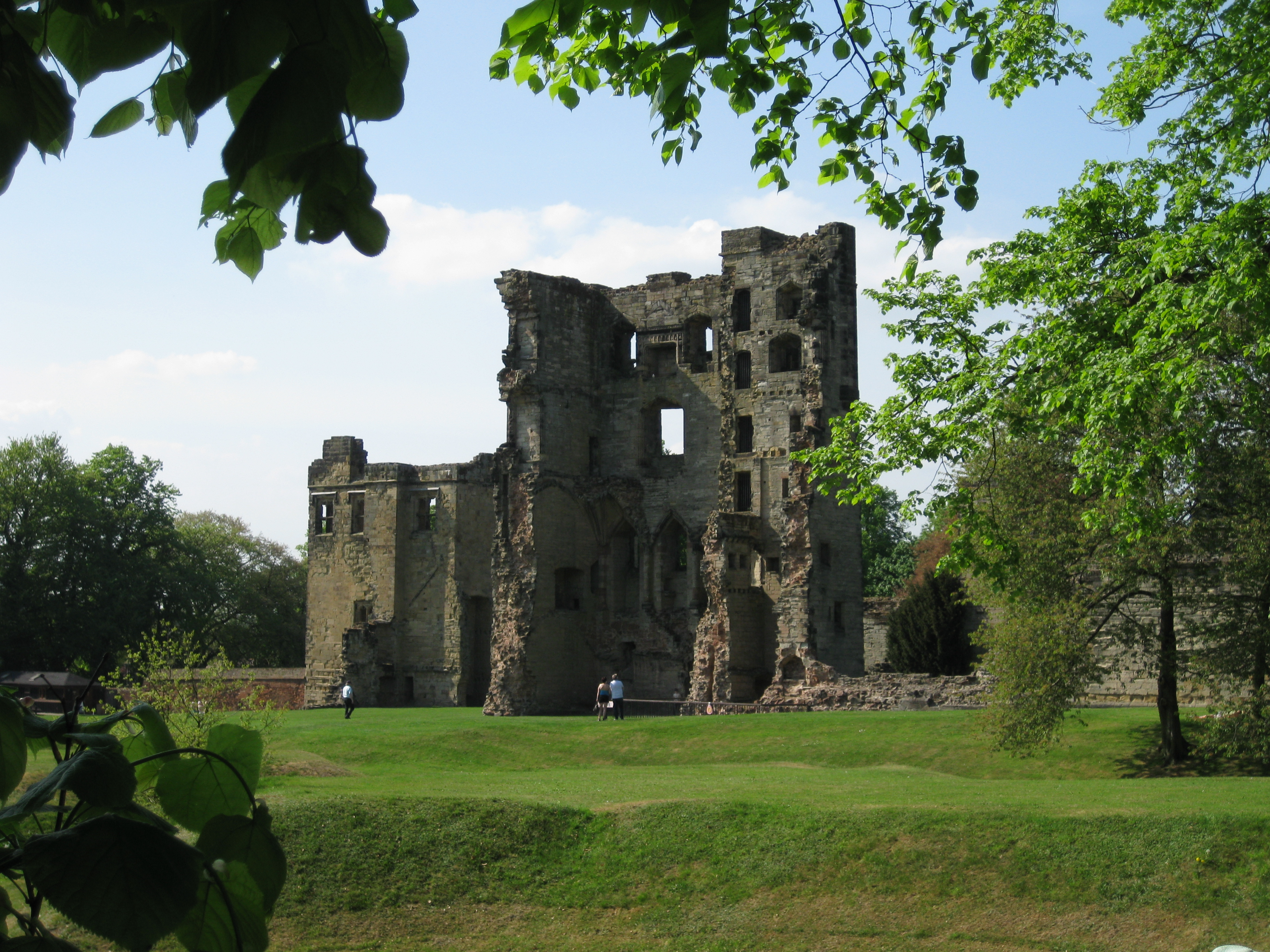
Ashby de la Zouch Castle

The town was known as Ashby in 1086. This is a name of Anglo-Danish origin, meaning "ash-tree farm" or "ash-tree settlement". The Norman French extension dates from the reign of Henry III, when Ashby became a possession of the La Zouche family.

Ashby de la Zouch Castle was built in the 12th century. The town and castle came into the possession of the Hastings family in 1464 and William Hastings, 1st Baron Hastings enhanced its fortifications from 1473. In the First English Civil War, the town was one of the Cavaliers' chief garrisons under the control of Colonel Henry Hastings, 1st Baron Loughborough and commander of the North Midlands Army and was where Charles I and his cavalry retreated to after the defeat at Naseby. When the town fell after a long siege in March 1646, it was counted a great relief to the surrounding towns and villages.

Many of the buildings in Market Street, the town's main thoroughfare, are timber framed. Most of this structure is hidden by later brick facades. The Bull's Head public house retains its original Elizabethan half-timbering, although most of this was plastered over some years ago and can no longer be seen from the street. A short distance further down Market Street is a shop, currently occupied as a LOROS Charity Shop, which retains its original Elizabethan timbers in full street view. Regency buildings are also standing in this street. Bath Street has a row of Classical-style houses called Rawdon Terrace, dating from the time of the 1820s, when the town was a spa destination.

== Governance ==
The town has a town council, the lowest level of local government in England. This has 17 councillors, representing six wards: Blackfordby ward (2 councillors), Castle ward (3), Holywell ward (3), Ivanhoe ward (3), Money Hill ward (3) and Willesley ward (3).

The town is in North West Leicestershire district. The district council has 38 wards which each elect one councillor, and these include wards named Ashby Castle, Ashby Holywell, Ashby Ivanhoe, Ashby Money Hill, Ashby Willesley and Ashby Woulds (ie a similar list to the town council wards but including Woulds instead of Blackfordby). It is represented on Leicestershire County Council by one councillor representing the electoral division named Ashby de la Zouch, one of 55 divisions.

The town is in the parliamentary constituency of North West Leicestershire, represented since 2024 by Amanda Hack of the Labour Party.

== Notable buildings ==
=== Churches ===
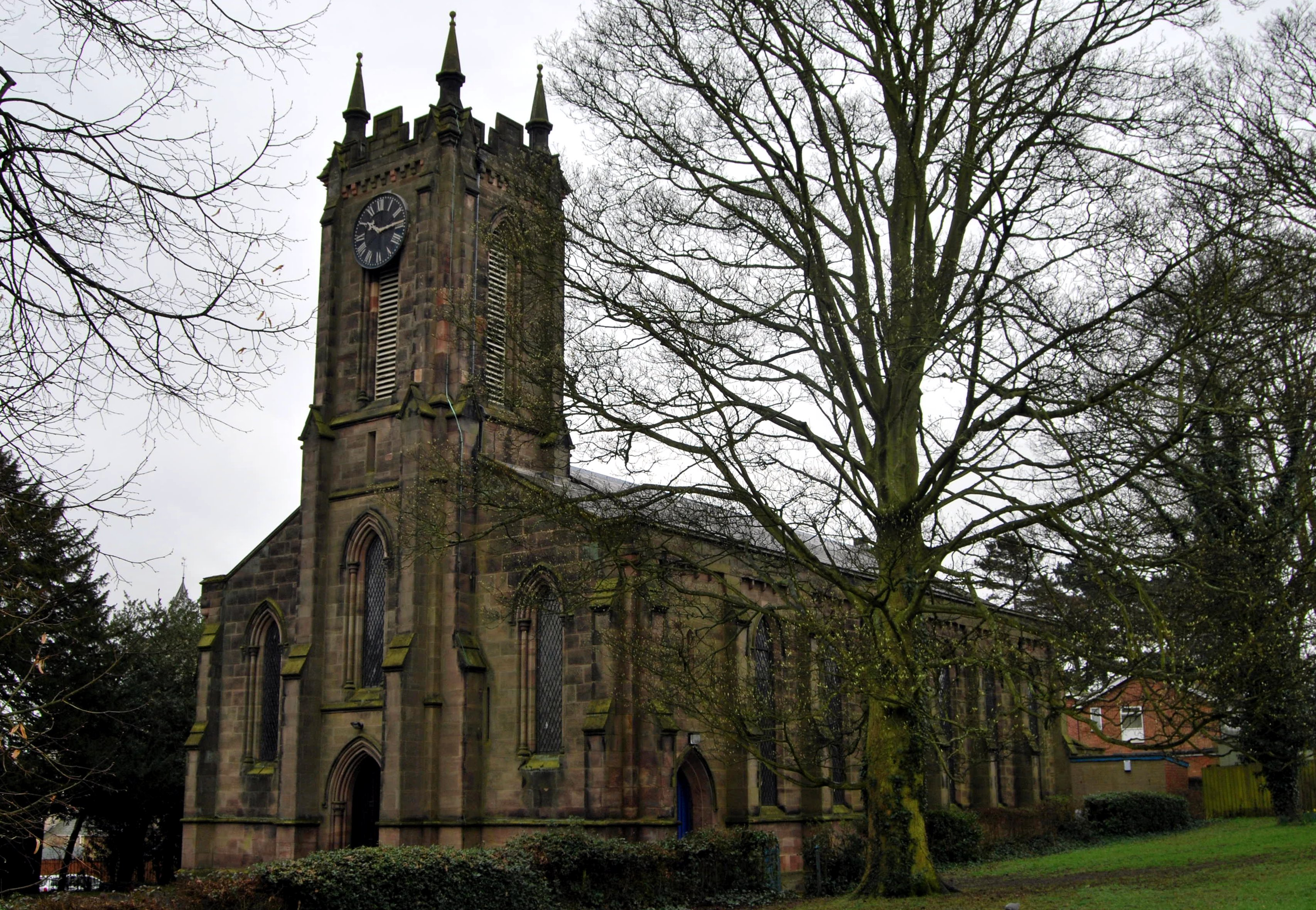
Holy Trinity parish church

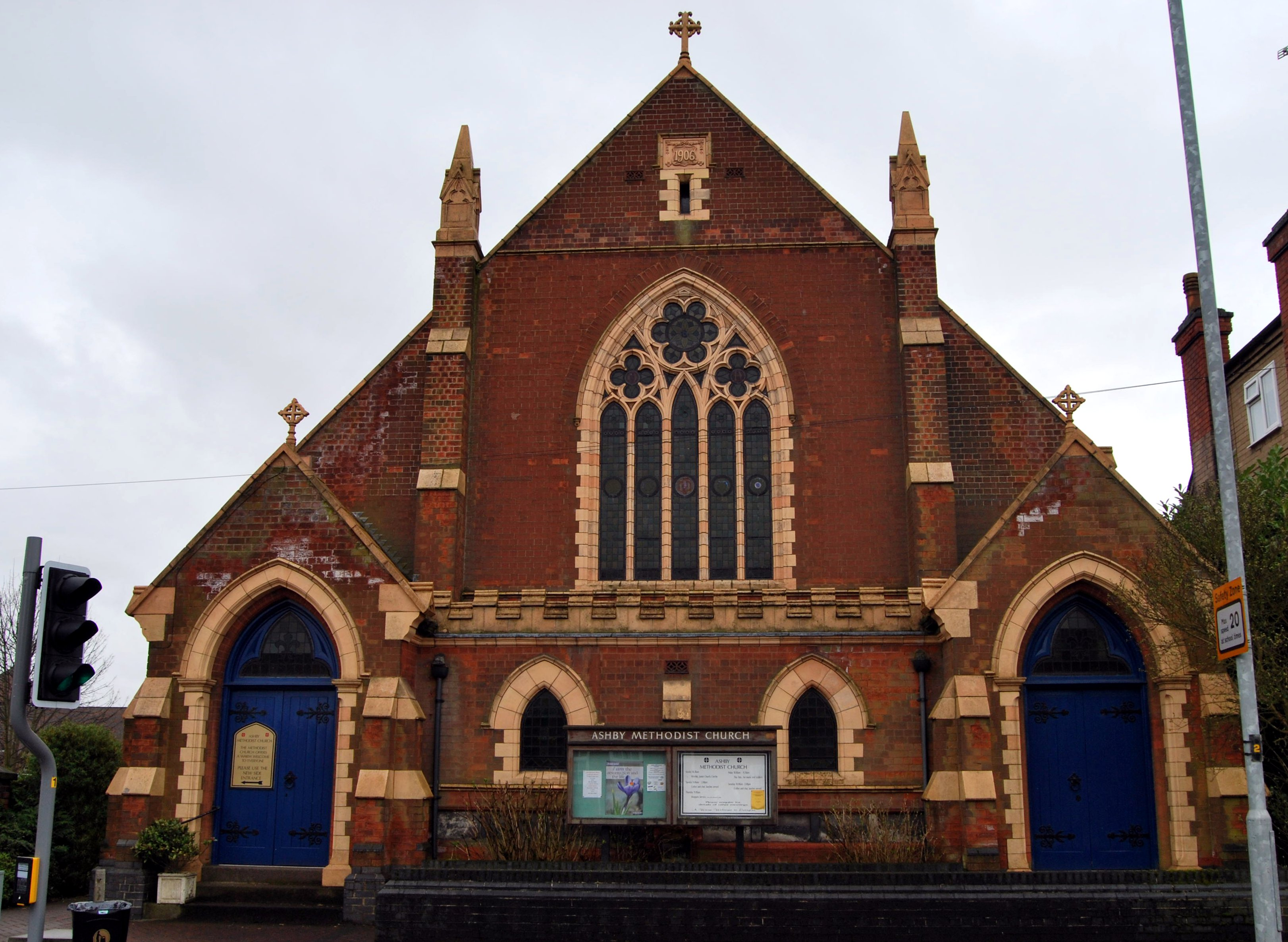
Methodist church

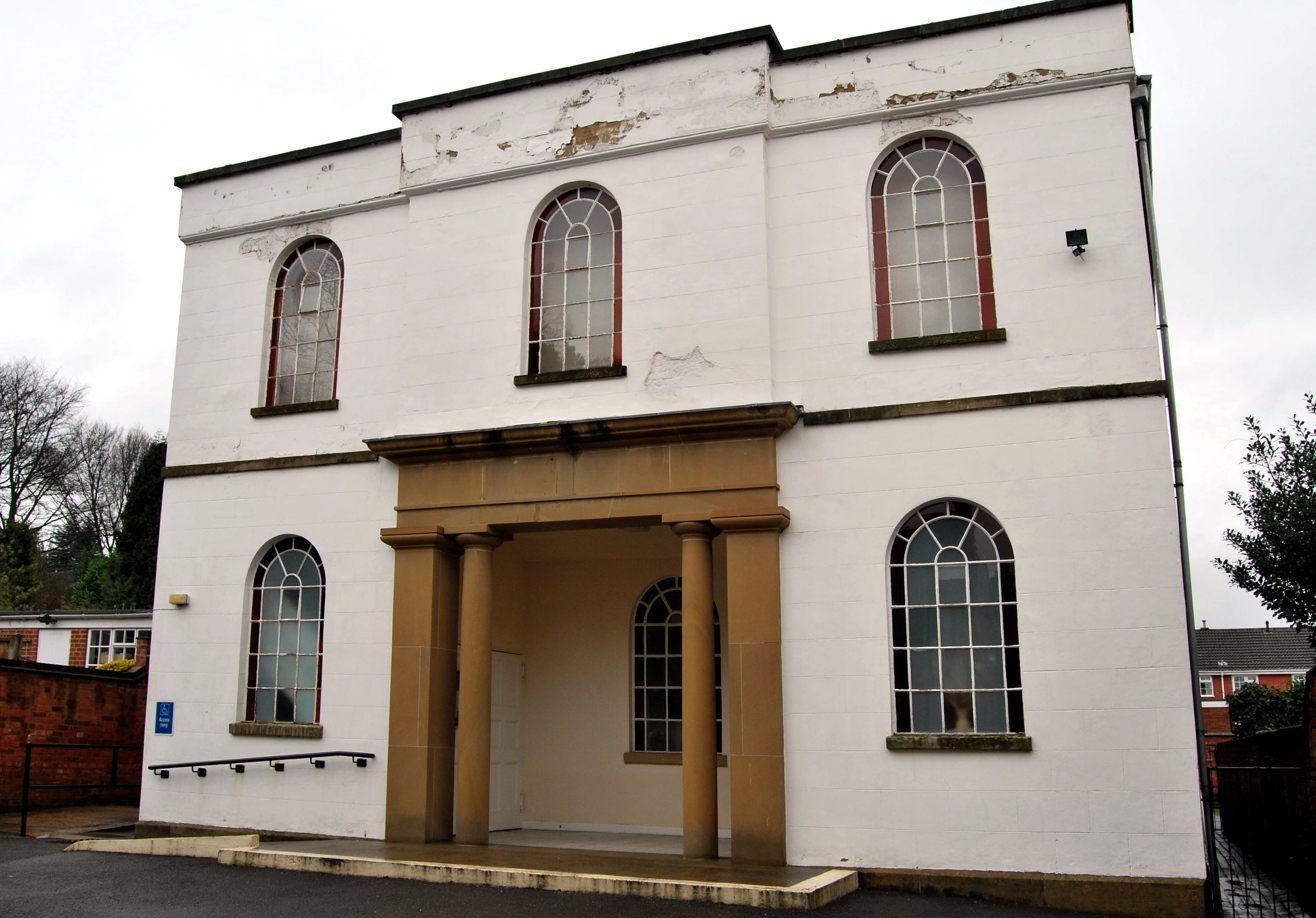
Congregational church

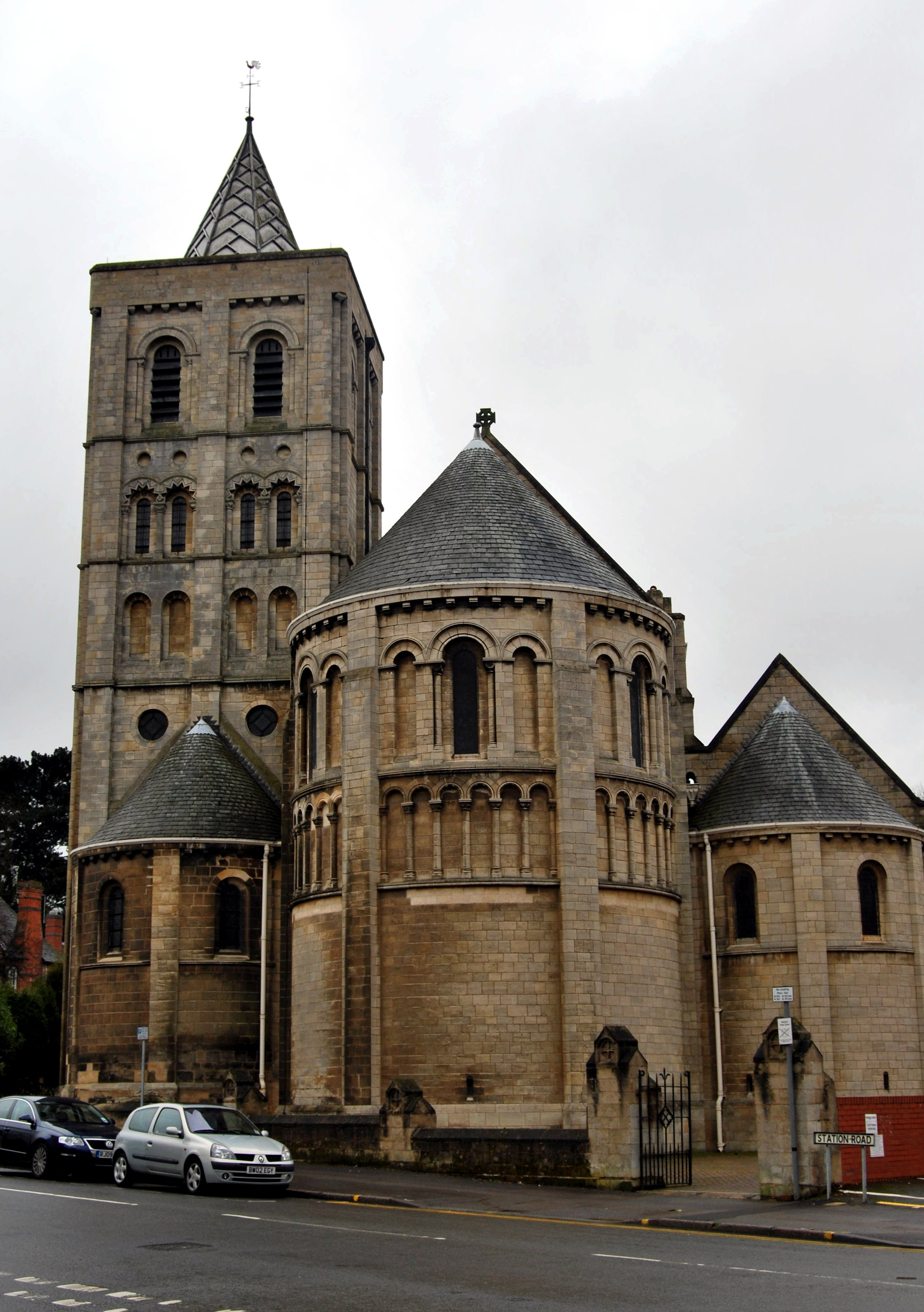
Our Lady of Lourdes Roman Catholic church

St Helen's Church is Ashby's original Anglican parish church. It is a late 15th-century Perpendicular Gothic building. The outer aisles were designed by J. P. St. Aubyn and added in 1878. St. Helen's contains notable memorials to various members of the Hastings family and other notables. It also holds a rare 300-year-old finger pillory.

Holy Trinity Church is a Gothic Revival building designed by H. I. Stevens in the Early English Gothic style and built in 1838–40. It has galleries supported by iron columns. The chancel was added in 1866 and the ironwork chancel screen in 1891.

The Roman Catholic Church of Our Lady of Lourdes was designed by F. A. Walters and built in 1908–15 at the expense of the 15th Duke of Norfolk. It is neo-Norman, with three apses and a tower at the southeast corner.

The Congregational Church was built in 1825 in a neoclassical style with Tuscan columns. There is also a Christadelphian meeting hall in the town.

=== Ivanhoe Baths ===
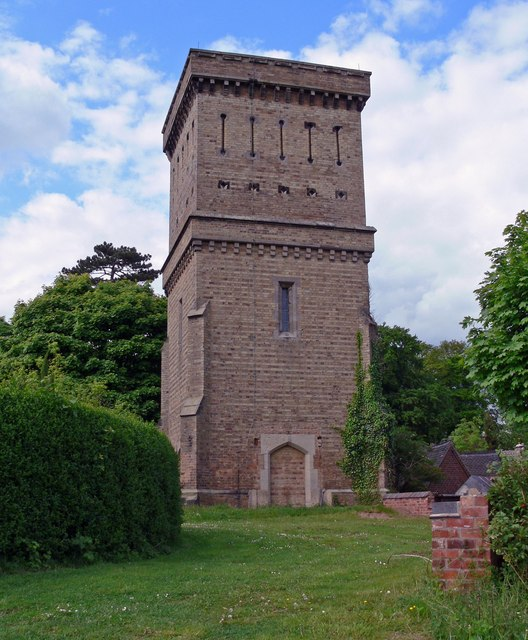
The water tower at Ashby de la Zouch cemetery, prior to its conversion into a dwelling

The Ivanhoe Baths was an 1822 Neo-Grecian building with a Doric façade 200 feet (61 m) long. Unused, it was derelict by 1960, and was demolished in 1962. Mineworkers discovered a copious saline spring when working coal at Moira Colliery, 3 miles (5 km) west of the town, in 1805. Here developers built the Moira Baths, with a large hotel nearby for travellers. After a few years, however, it was decided to convey the water to Ashby, where the Ivanhoe Baths were built. The Royal Hotel, originally called the Hastings Hotel, was built in 1826 to accommodate visitors to the growing spa. It has a Doric porte-cochère and additional Doric columns in its hall inside. The hotel closed in February 2018.

=== Water tower ===
The Grade II-listed, 19th-century water tower, located in the town's cemetery on Moira Road, has been converted into a dwelling. The conversion was controversial since it involved a number of modern additions to the building.

=== Loudoun Monument ===
In 1879, Baron Donington, the widowed husband of Edith Rawdon-Hastings, 10th Countess of Loudoun, had the Loudoun monument erected to her memory in Ashby. The octagonal monument by Sir George Gilbert Scott is based on the Eleanor crosses and is a Listed building. It is located at the junction of Bath and South Streets, opposite the Roman Catholic church.

=== Ashby-de-la-Zouch Town Hall ===
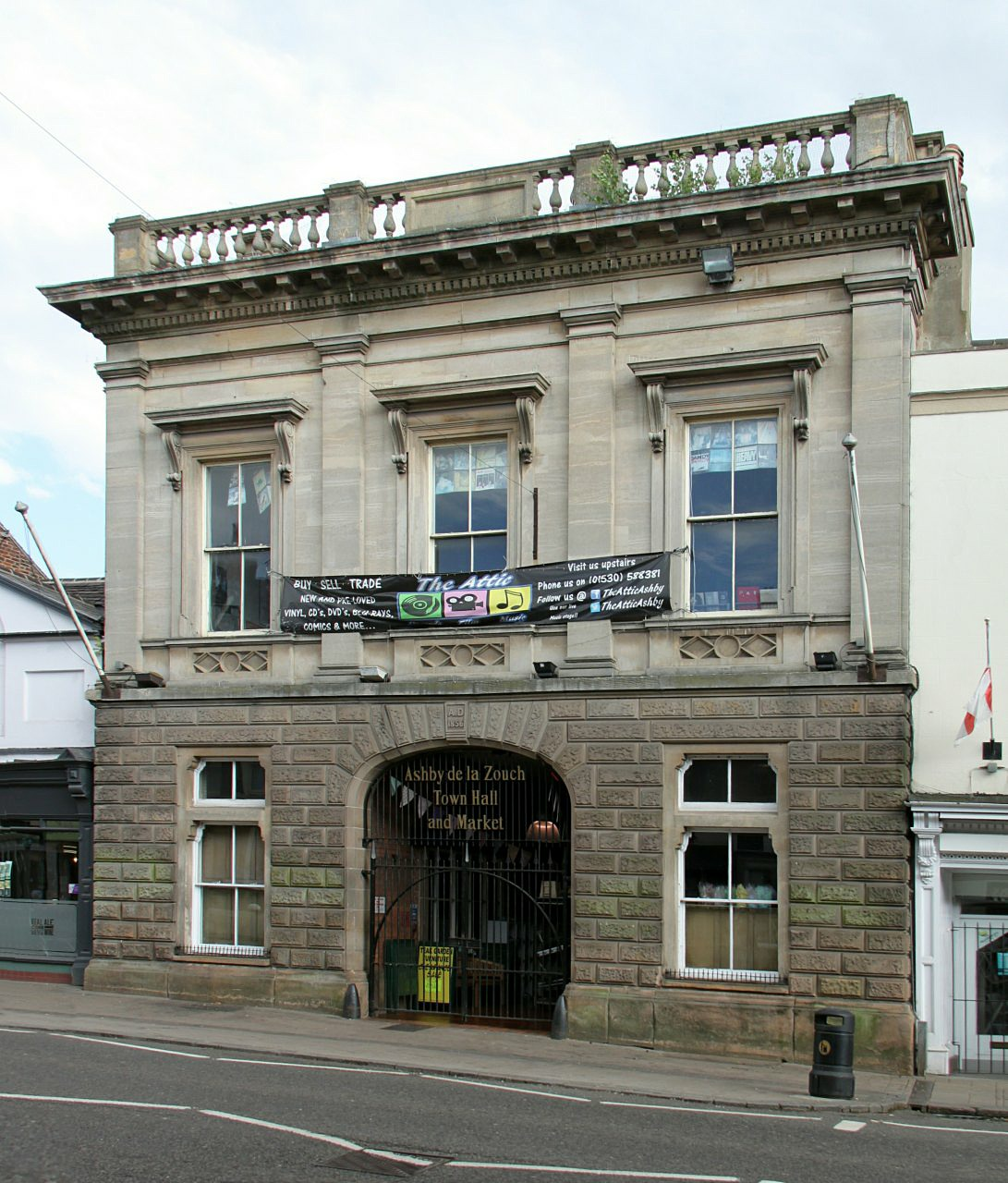
Ashby-de-la-Zouch Town Hall

Ashby-de-la-Zouch Town Hall, which was built at the same time as the market hall to its rear, dates to 1857.

== Education ==
The town has two secondary schools:

- Ashby School, previously Ashby Grammar School, is for 11- to 18-year-olds. It was founded in 1567. The town formerly had two other endowed boys' schools founded in the 18th century.
- Ivanhoe School, previously Ivanhoe College, is for 11- to 16-year-olds. It was founded in 1954. It is named after the historical novel Ivanhoe by Sir Walter Scott, which he set in the area of the castle. In Scott's novel the town hosts an important archery competition held by Prince John, in which Robin Hood competes and wins.

Manor House School was an independent day school in the centre of Ashby for boys and girls aged four to 16. The school was located between St Helen's Church and the ruins of Ashby's historic castle. Pupils travelled to the school from a wide area. However the school entered administration on 13 December 2018.

== Business ==
In the 19th century, Ashby's main industry was leather working. There was also a cotton textile factory and a glue factory. Ashby was surrounded by coalmines but was never a coalmining town itself. By far the largest employer in the town today is United Biscuits, providing about 2,000 jobs at its distribution centre, which stores its products and transports them nationwide, and its KP Snacks factory in Smisby Road. The firm formerly had a larger presence in Ashby. McVitie's biscuit factory on Smisby Road closed in 2004 with the loss of 900 jobs.

Other employers in Ashby include Tesco, Ashfield Commercial & Medical Services, Timeline Communications, Eduteq Limited and TAC UK Ltd, a firm of energy consultants. Standard Soap Ltd, a significant industrial employer within Ashby-de-la-Zouch since 1928, closed in early 2012, resulting in the loss of 155 jobs. The town has a concentration of high-tech employers. The video game software house Ultimate Play the Game was based in Ashby. Now called Rare, it has moved to Manor Park near Twycross.

== Recreation ==
Ashby United Community Football Club is a community club for juniors and seniors of all ages. They play across multiple divisions across all of their Junior and Senior teams and are seen as leading the way in community inclusion when it comes to football and sports in the town.

Willesley Park Golf Course is set in rolling countryside, partly in parkland and partly on heathland, covering 230 acres of gentle undulating countryside. The course was opened for play in April 1921. The first hole is played along an avenue of lime trees which once flanked the old coach road from the old Norman castle in the town to the now demolished Willesley Hall.

Ashby Hastings Cricket Club was founded before 1831. Its ground, the Bath Grounds in the centre of Ashby, hosts Leicestershire CCC 2nd XI matches each year. The club runs three Saturday League sides, all of which play in the Everard's Leicestershire County Cricket League. The 1st XI play in the Premier Division, the highest level of club cricket available in Leicestershire, the 2nd XI play in Division 4, and the 3rd XI play in Division 8. The club also runs a Midweek XI who play in the Premier Division of the Loughborough Cricket Association League, and a Sunday XI, who play friendly cricket. The club's Junior Section includes sides at Under 15, Under 13, Under 11, and Under 10 age groups. A second club, Ashby Town Cricket Club, was formed in 1945.

Ashby RFC has its grounds in Nottingham Road. It plays in the League Midland 3 East (North). It also has mini and junior sections for girls and boys from age four, as well as seniors and seconds side and an O2 Touch team for players of all ages and both genders.

The town also has a bridge club (Ashby Bridge Club), and a hockey club (Ashby Hockey Club)

A greyhound racing track was opened on 3 April 1931. The racing was independent (not affiliated to the sports governing body the National Greyhound Racing Club) known as a flapping track, which was the nickname given to independent tracks. Racing was held on Tuesday and Saturday evenings and distances included 200, 350, 550 and 525 yards. The date of closure is thought to be around 1935.

Ivanhoe Runners, established in 1985, is a road, cross-country, and social running club based in Ashby de la Zouch. The club organises the annual Ashby 20-mile road race event, usually held five weeks ahead of the London Marathon. The race is set on a route that is used as pre-marathon race preparation or as a goal in itself. The race is established on the athletics calendar and sells out. For many years the race has been sponsored by Aldi and rewards finishers with a Ashby 20 hoody instead of a medal, along with a cheese cob. The race has received the highest Gold BARR grading annually since 2006 for its organisation and well-stocked water stations. In 2017, the Ashby 20 was awarded the Bill Reynolds Award for Excellence, recognising its organisation, medical and emergency provision, and community links. Each year, the race is supported by a number of local organisations, such as Leicestershire Search and Rescue, Ashby Endurance Explorer Scouts, the Rotary Club of Ashby Castle, Ashby Town Council, North West Leicestershire District Council, Derby Runner, Conkers Park Run, and Heartwize Runners.

== Transport ==
The town was to be served by Ashby Canal from 1804 but the canal never reached Ashby, as it was constructed only to the village of Moira. The town was served by the Leicester–Burton upon Trent line of the Midland Railway and had its own station. After the canal was abandoned in stages between 1944 and 1966, British Railways withdrew the passenger service and closed Ashby de la Zouch railway station in September 1964. The railway remains open for freight. There were also connections to both the Melbourne Line and Ashby and Nuneaton Joint Railway connecting the town with the towns of Melbourne, Market Bosworth, Hinckley and Nuneaton as well as the city of Derby, but these lines closed between the 1950s and 1980s. Both of the lines now form footpaths with some of the old stations still present but others demolished.

In the 1990s, BR planned to restore passenger services between Leicester and Burton as the second phase of its Ivanhoe Line project. However, after the privatisation of British Rail in 1995, this phase of the project was shelved. In 2009, the Association of Train Operating Companies published a £49-million proposal to restore passenger services to the line, which would include reopening a station at Ashby.

The nearest railway station is Burton-on-Trent, 8 miles (13 km) away. The fastest train to London in the mornings and evenings is from Tamworth (12 miles from Ashby) to Euston at 1hr 2mins average non-stop at peak hours.

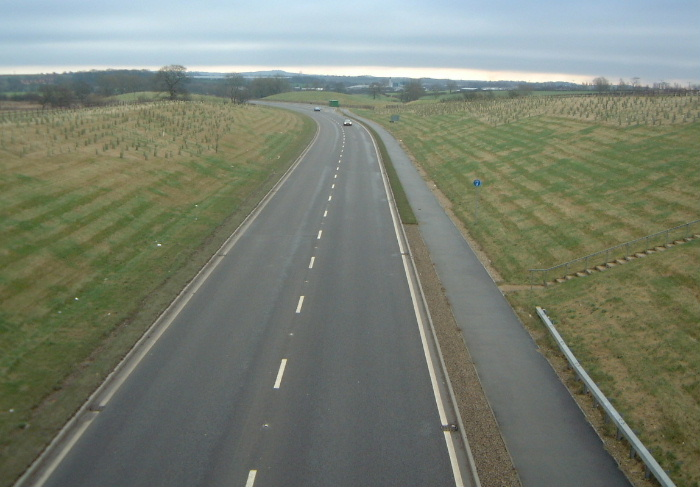
A511 Ashby bypass

The A50 Leicester to Stoke-on-Trent road and the A453 Birmingham to Nottingham road used to pass through the town centre. The heavy traffic, which previously travelled through the town, has been greatly relieved by the A42 and A511 bypasses, which replace the A453 and A50, respectively.

Bus routes provide an hourly direct service to Burton-upon-Trent, Coalville, East Midlands Airport, Leicester and Swadlincote (Diamond East Midlands 9 and 19, and Arriva Midlands 29, 29A and X29). The National Express coach network is available in Leicester, which has a daily direct service to London.

East Midlands Airport is 9 miles (14 km) north-east of Ashby. It provides flights to and from other parts of the UK and Europe. For International travellers, Birmingham Airport is 26 miles away (c. 30 mins) and provides international flights.

== Media ==
Television signals can only be received from the Sutton Coldfield TV transmitter which broadcasts programmes from Birmingham. However, BBC East Midlands and ITV Central are also received through cable and satellite television such as Freesat and Sky.

Local radio stations are BBC Radio Leicester, Smooth East Midlands, Capital Midlands, Hits Radio East Midlands, Greatest Hits Radio Midlands, and Hermitage FM, a community based station.

Local newspapers are Ashby Nub News and Leicester Mercury.

== Culture ==
Every May, Ashby holds an arts festival sponsored by the district council. This features local artists, musicians, songwriters, poets, performers, and story tellers. The multiple sites around the town host exhibitions, musical performances, workshops and talks, and the town centre is decorated with flags and an outdoor gallery.

Ashby Statutes, a travelling funfair, is held every September. Instituted by Royal Statute, it was originally a hiring fair, where domestic servants and farmworkers would be hired for the year. During the fair in the 21st century, Market Street, the main road through the town (the former A50 trunk road), is closed for nearly a week. The traffic is diverted along narrower roads either side of Market Street. Locals call this event "The Statutes".

A song "Ashby de la Zouch (Castle Abbey)", written by Al Hoffman, Milton Drake and Jerry Livingston, was recorded by the Merry Macs in 1946 on Decca No. 18811. It includes the lines "If you wanna smooch and be happy as a pooch, go to Ashby de la Zouch by the sea." (Ashby-de-la-Zouch is close to the centre of England, almost as far from the sea as is possible.) In April 1946, the American jazz bassist and composer Charles Mingus recorded a tune called "Ashby de la Zouch" with his band. The title or choice of song could have been an acknowledgement of guitarist Irving Ashby, who took part in the recording. Ashby-de-la-Zouch is twinned with Pithiviers in north-central France.

Ashby-de-la-Zouch is mentioned in Ivanhoe, the novel by Sir Walter Scott set in 1194, as "the lists at Ashby" and as "the lists at Ashby-de-la-Zouch", suggesting that jousting may once have taken place in the town (lists being the barriers through which the respective steeds charge during a joust). The same phrase is used in the original computer game Defender of the Crown, which apparently drew inspiration from Scott's novel.

== Notable people ==
- Robin Beanland (born 1968), video game music composer, musician and Ivor Novello Award winner.
- Mark Chadbourn (born 1960), author and screenwriter, was born in Ashby de la Zouch Cottage Hospital and still lives in the area.
- Frederick Bailey Deeming (1853–1892), serial killer and Jack The Ripper suspect
- Anthony Gilby (c. 1510–1585), Puritan sage
- James Green (born 1944), crime and non-fiction author, lived in the area in the 1970s and 1980s.
- Joseph Hall (1574–1656), satirist and bishop, was born in Ashby de la Zouch.
- Frank Abney Hastings (1794–1828), British naval officer and Philhellene
- Annie Haynes (1864–1929), mystery author, was born in Ashby-de-la-Zouch in September 1864.
- Lara Jones (1975–2010), children's author, was born in Ashby.
- Grant Kirkhope (born 1962), video game music composer and musician
- James Martin (1933–2013), an IT consultant and author, was born in Ashby de la Zouch.
- Tim and Chris Stamper (living), brothers who were video game programmers, were known for founding the Ultimate Play the Game and Rareware companies.
- Bernard Vann (1887–1918), taught at Ashby School, before entering the priesthood and then winning a VC, an MC and a Croix de Guerre as an army officer in the First World War.
- Michael Wakelam (1955–2020), molecular biologist, director of the Babraham Institute in Cambridge, England.
- Alastair Yates (1952–2018), former presenter on BBC News and BBC World News, went to Manor House School, Ashby; his farming family still live in the town.
- Young Knives, band formed in Ashby

=== Sports ===
- Russell Hoult (born 1972), footballer, was born in Ashby and still lives locally (at Coleorton).
- Niall Mackenzie (born 1961), Grand Prix motorcycle racer, is now retired in Ashby.
- Dolly Shepherd (1887–1983), aviator, made her return to parachuting from balloons in a display at Ashby, after recovering from a near-fatal accident.
- Paul Taylor (born 1964), England cricketer, was born in the town.
- Roger Williamson (1948–1973), Formula One driver, born in Ashby de la Zouch.

== In popular culture ==
- This town is where the tournament for knights and archers described in Chapters VII to XIV of the novel Ivanhoe, by Walter Scott, was held. Both King Richard and Locksley showed their prowess before John, brother of Richard. The novel was set in 1194.
- Adrian Mole, a fictional diarist and TV chef (b.1967) created by writer Sue Townsend, was from Leicester and moved to Ashby de la Zouch during his lifetime.
- The protagonist of the 1994 video game Universe is from Ashby-de-la-Zouch.
- Harry Flashman, Sir Harry Paget Flashman is a fictional character created by Thomas Hughes (1822–1896) in the semi-autobiographical Tom Brown's School Days (1857) and later developed by George MacDonald Fraser (1925–2008). Sir Harry, after his inglorious career, retired to his country home, Gandamack Lodge, in Ashby, there to write his memoirs, known to the public as The Flashman Papers.
- Ashby de la Zouch is often mentioned by Guz Khan in his show Man Like Mobeen, where some characters who "go on holiday to Ashby de la Zouch" mistakenly say it is in Spain rather than Leicestershire.

== Location ==
Neighbouring communities include Lount, Normanton le Heath, Smisby, Packington, Donisthorpe, Oakthorpe, Moira, Measham and Coleorton.
