= List of vicars of St Helen's Church, Ashby-de-la-Zouch =

The vicars of St Helen's Church, Ashby-de-la-Zouch from 1200 onwards are as follows:

- 1200 Roger
- 1224 Reginald
- 1240 Elias
- 1246 Elias de Roger
- 1304 John de Esseby
- 1314 William de Bromyard
- 1315 William Lucas de Viterton
- 1349 Richard Page
- 1350 William de Donnton
- 1364 Elias de Trykingham
- 1413 John de Burton
- 1414 William Pepur
- 1455 William Ederyche
- 1456 Robert Sharpe
- 1463 Henry Dalkyns
- 1477 John Harrison
- 1504 Edward Fox
- 1508 William Shelton
- 1533 Patrick Chevir
- 1534 John Grevys
- 1552 George Harrison
- 1564 Anthony Gilby
- 1583 Nathaniel Gilby
- 1584 Thomas Wyddowes
- 1593 Arthur Hildersham
- 1632 Anthony Watson
- 1646 William Coke
- 1652 Ithiel Smart
- 1662 Alexander Jones
- 1671 Gowyn Knight
- 1673 Francis Chapman
- 1676 Ithiel Smart
- 1691 Henry Hooton
- 1693 John Lord
- 1711 Anthony Johnson
- 1715 Joseph Smith
- 1721 Samuel Holbrooke
- 1729 Peter Cowper
- 1783 John Prior
- 1804 William MacDowell
- 1828 Robert Behoe Radcliffe
- 1833 Charles Dundas
- 1834 Canon Marmaduke Vavasour
- 1875 Canon John Denton
- 1903 Percy Rawson Preston
- 1906 Canon Herbert Edward Sawyer
- 1923 Basil Charles Floyd Andrewes
- 1928 Francis Horace Jones
- 1931 Canon Hugh Duncan Hanford
- 1958 Francis Michael Ambrose Payne
- 1963 Canon John Edward Bowers
- 1989 Charles Philip Dobbin
- 2002 Brian Robertson
