= Ivanhoe School =

British public secondary institution

Location
- North Street; Ashby-de-la-Zouch, Leicestershire, LE65 1HX; England
- Coordinates: 52°45′00″N 1°28′07″W

Information
- Type: academy
- Motto: With the right attitude, Attending every day, You will achieve
- Established: 1954
- Founder: Sir Walter Scott
- Department for Education URN: 138350 Tables
- Ofsted: Reports
- Headteacher: Jen Steer
- Gender: Coeducational
- Age: 11 to 16
- Enrolment: 861
- Website: https://www.ivanhoe.co.uk

Ivanhoe School (formerly Ivanhoe College) is a coeducational secondary school located in Ashby-de-la-Zouch, Leicestershire, England.

The school was established in 1954 and named after the historical novel Ivanhoe by Sir Walter Scott, part of which was set at Ashby de la Zouch Castle.

It was previously a community middle school with specialist technology college status. In July 2012 Ivanhoe College converted to academy status. In September 2022 the school expanded its age range to 16, becoming a secondary school.
