= Margaret Lane =

British journalist, biographer and novelist (1907–1994)

- Lane in 1935
- Born: 23 June 1907
- Died: 14 February 1994 (aged 86); Southampton, Hampshire, England
- Education: St Stephen's College, Broadstairs; St Hugh's College, Oxford
- Occupations: Journalist; biographer; novelist
- Spouse(s): Bryan Wallace (m. 1934–1939) Francis Hastings, 16th Earl of Huntingdon (m. 1944; died 1990)
- Children: 2, including Selina
- Parent(s): Harry George Lane; Edith Webb

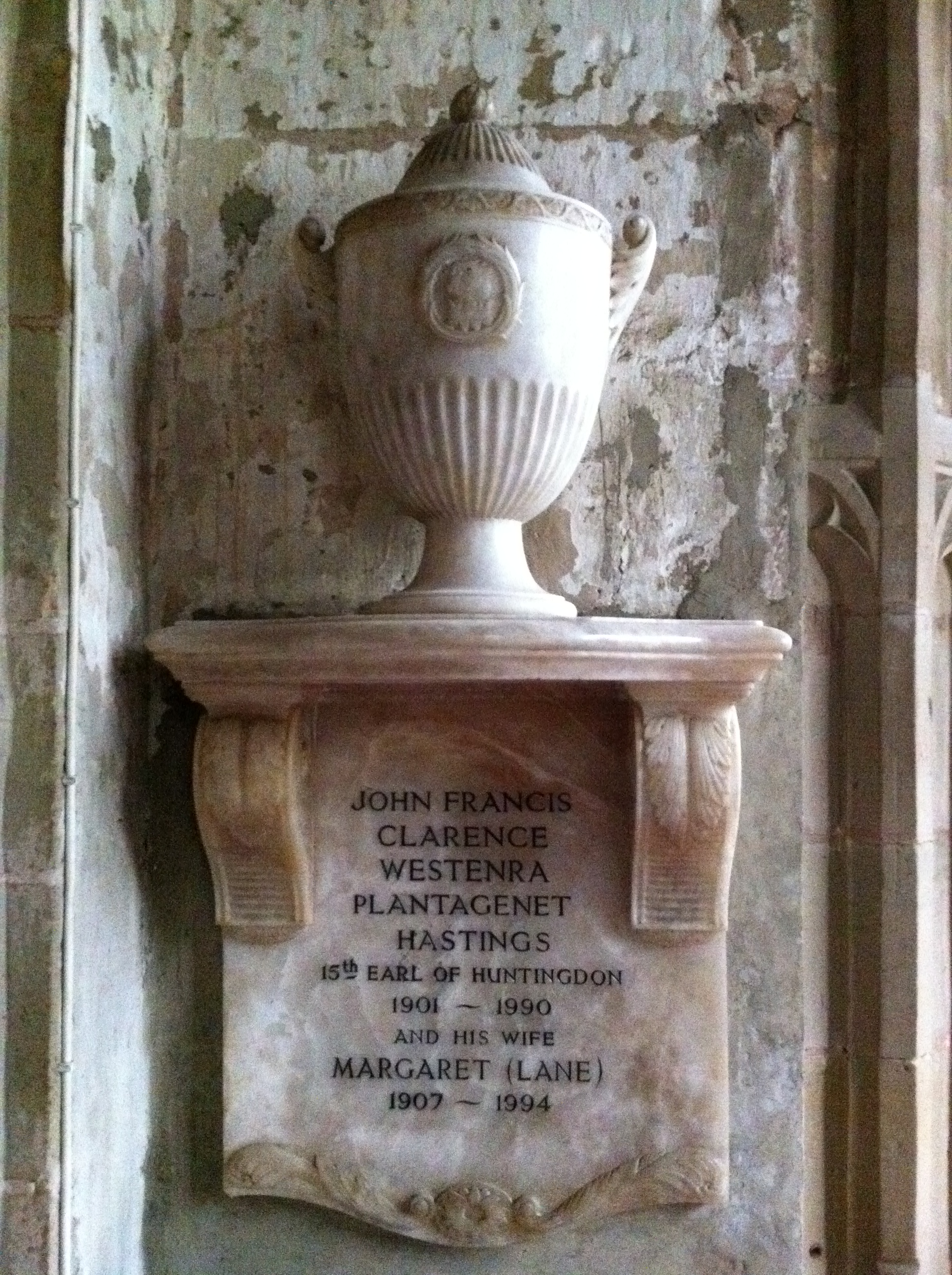
Memorial in St Helen's Church, Ashby-de-la-Zouch

Margaret Winifred Lane (23 June 1907 – 14 February 1994) was a British journalist, biographer and novelist, the author of more than two dozen books. She was the second wife of Francis Hastings, 16th Earl of Huntingdon.

== Early life ==
Margaret Lane was born on 23 June 1907, the only child of Edith (née Webb), daughter of a glass dealer, and Harry George Lane, a newspaper editor. She was educated at St Stephen's College (sisters of St John Baptist) and St Hugh's College, Oxford.

== Career ==
After university, she worked as a reporter for the Daily Express, from 1928 to 1931, and then as a special correspondent for the International News Service from 1931 to 1932, while there she interviewed the gangster Al Capone. From 1932 to 1938, she was a journalist for the Daily Mail, where she was the UK's highest-paid woman journalist.

Lane wrote two biographies of Beatrix Potter, The Tale of Beatrix Potter: a Biography in 1946, and The Magic Years of Beatrix Potter in 1978. In 1984, the BBC produced a two-part television dramatisation of Potter's life based on Lane's books, The Tale of Beatrix Potter with Penelope Wilton in the lead role, that was "praised as a simple yet intense story with just the right touches of unflinching reserve." Lane also wrote books about the Brontë sisters (1953) and Samuel Johnson (1975).

In all, Lane wrote more than two dozen books, including novels, travelogues and children's books. Her trilogy about expats in Tangiers - A Night at Sea, A Smell of Burning and The Day of the Feast - was highly praised by Colin Wilson and others.

== Personal life ==
In 1934, she married Bryan Wallace, a film screenwriter and son of the writer Edgar Wallace. Their marriage was dissolved in 1939. Lane's biography of Edgar Wallace was published in 1938.

On 1 February 1944, she married Francis Hastings, 16th Earl of Huntingdon (1901–1990), who had divorced his first wife Cristina (who then married Wogan Philipps, 2nd Baron Milford) the previous year. They had two daughters, the writer Selina Hastings (Lady Selina Shirley Hastings, born 1945), and Lady Caroline Harriet Hastings (born 1946).

She died in Southampton on 14 February 1994.

== Selected publications ==
- Faith, Hope, No Charity (1935)
- At Last, the Island (1937)
- Edgar Wallace, the Biography of a Phenomenon (1938)
- Walk Into My Parlour (1941)
- Where Helen Lies (1944)
- The Tale of Beatrix Potter: a Biography (1946)
- The Brontë Story (1953)
- A Crown of Convolvulus (1954)
- A Calabash of Diamonds (1961)
- Life With Ionides (1963)
- A Night at Sea (1965)
- A Smell of Burning (1966)
- Purely for Pleasure (1966)
- The Day of the Feast (1968)
- Samuel Johnson and His World (1975)
- The Magic Years of Beatrix Potter (1978)
