= Annie Haynes =

Mystery novel writer

Annie Haynes (September 1864 – 30 March 1929) was a British mystery writer.

== Early life ==
Haynes was born in Ashby-de-la-Zouch, Leicestershire, in September 1864. The exact date of her birth is unknown, she was christened on 7 October 1864. She was the eldest child of ironmonger, Edwin Haynes, and his wife, Jane. Her parents separated when she was young and she grew up living with her mother, brother, and grandparents on the Coleorton Hall estate where her grandfather, Montgomery Henderson, worked as a gardener.

== Career ==
After her mother's death in 1905, Haynes moved from Leicestershire to London and lived with her friend Ada Heather-Bigg, a journalist, philanthropist and feminist, at 14 Radnor Place, Hyde Park. According to Heather-Bigg, Haynes had an 'intense interest in crime and criminal psychology': she once cycled to Ightham in Kent to visit the scene of Caroline Mary Luard's 1908 murder and pushed her way into the Hilldrop Crescent home of Dr Crippen after the remains of his wife Corrine were found in the cellar in 1910. Haynes also attended Dr Crippen's trial.

Haynes's mystery A Pawn of Chance was serialised in the London Daily News in October and November 1909. According to the newspaper, by this time she was also the author of The Manor Tragedy, Fontenoy's Wife, Under False Colours, A Secret of the Cliffs and Pamela's Cousins. In 1912, Lady Carew;s Secret was serialised in a number of UK regional newspapers. The story would later be republished as Haynes's second novel, The Abbey Court Murder. Between 1913 and 1919 a number of Haynes's mysteries were serialised in the regional press, these included Footprints of Fate, Cicely Vibart's Love, Charmian's Lovers and The Governess at the Priory (which later became the novel The Master of the Priory).

In 1914, at the age of 50, Haynes began suffering from rheumatoid arthritis which Heather-Bigg described as leaving Haynes 'in constant pain'. She said that eventually, 'It was impossible for her to go out into the world for fresh material for her books, her only journeys being from her bedroom to her study.'

Haynes's first novel, The Bungalow Mystery, was published by Agatha Christie's publisher, The Bodley Head, in 1923. Haynes and Christie were the only two female authors to be published by the imprint. Eleven more novels followed, the last two being published posthumously.

The Abbey Court Murder, The House in Charlton Crescent and The Crow's Inn Tragedy all featured the character Inspector Furnival. The Man with the Dark Beard, The Crime at Tattenham Corner, Who Killed Charmian Karslake? and The Crystal Beads Murder featured Inspector Stoddart.

Haynes devised complex plots in her work and combined the style of nineteenth century sensation novels with Golden Age detective fiction. In her work, the emotions of female protagonists and themes of scandal, secrets and romance often took precedence over the detective plot line.

After suffering from crippling rheumatoid arthritis for fifteen years, Haynes died of heart failure, aged 64, on 30 March 1929. Her novel Who Killed Charmian Karslake? was published later the same year. Haynes died leaving The Crystal Beads Murder unfinished, it was completed by an anonymous writer and published in 1930.

In 2015, Haynes's novels were re-published by Dean Street Press. In an introduction to the 2015 edition of The Crystal Beads Murder, author Curtis Evans speculates that the anonymous writer who completed the book after Haynes's death was Lucy Beatrice Malleson who also wrote under the pen names Anthony Gilbert and Anne Meredith.

== Publications ==
Featuring Inspector Furnival:

The Abbey Court Murder (1923)

The House in Charlton Crescent (1926)

The Crow's Inn Tragedy (1927)

Featuring Inspector Stoddart:

The Man with the Dark Beard (1928)

The Crime at Tattenham Corner (1929)

Who Killed Charmian Karslake? (1929)

The Crystal Beads Murder (1930, completed by another writer)

Standalone novels:

The Bungalow Mystery (1923)

The Secret of Greylands (1924)

The Blue Diamond (1925)

The Witness on the Roof (1925)

The Master of the Priory (1927)
