= James Green (author) =

British writer and broadcaster (born 1944)

Jim Green
- Born: James Green; 3 December 1944 (age 81); Coventry, Warwickshire, England
- Citizenship: British
- Education: St. Mary's Teacher Training College, Twickenham.
- Occupations: Author, headmaster.
- Spouse: Patricia Brennan (1970–2023)
- Children: Dominic Green (d), James Green (d), Joe Green
- Writing career
- Genres: Thriller, historical espionage, poetry, travel.
- Subject: English thesaurus
- Notable works: Another Small Kingdom, Bad Catholics, A Wordhunter's Companion All The World's a Pub!
- Notable awards: CWA Dagger Awards Nominee

James "Jim" Green (born 3 December 1944 in Coventry) is a British writer and broadcaster who turned to writing as a full-time profession after a long career in teaching. He has had over 40 titles published in various genres, from educational text books to travel guides to crime novels to historical espionage. His first foray into crime novels was called Bad Catholics (2010 Luath), the first part of a 6 book series chronicling the exploits of corrupt CID officer, Jimmy Costello. James has then moved to Accent Press to write a five book series on the development of the US intelligence services through fictionalised accounts of real events and people. The series begins in 1802 with the Louisiana Purchase and ends with Winston's Witch, centred around the trial and conviction at London's Old Bailey of Helen Duncan, a medium, under the Witchcraft Act 1735 which took place in 1944.

== Early life ==
Green was raised and attended school in Coventry, Warwickshire. He was the second of three children, his brothers being Michael (b. 1938) and Francis 'Frank', (1948–2001). All three brothers eventually became primary school headteachers. Jim Green was educated by the Vincentian Fathers at Bishop Ullathorne Grammar School, Coventry. He left school at sixteen and, after working as coal-miner, farm-worker, motor-cycle courier and building labourer, he went to St. Mary's College, Twickenham and qualified as a teacher.

== Career ==
=== Teaching ===
During his teaching career Jim acquired, by part-time study, an Open University B.A. and a research M.A. in Education. He studied, again part-time and for three years, for a PhD in Education at Leicester University but, in 1983, the school where he was head teacher was completely destroyed by an arson attack and the final write-up of the research for the Doctorate was postponed, as it turned out, indefinitely. In 1997 Jim left teaching to become a full-time writer and published magazine articles and books on travel. He then began writing the first of what was to become the Jimmy Costello series.

=== Turn to writing ===
By the 1970s Green was a rising primary headteacher and began writing educational books as a sideline. A thesaurus for primary schools A Wordhunter's Companion was his first best-seller and remains in print in several countries to date having been translated into a number of languages. Moving on from writing educational textbooks mainly for Harper Collins he began writing travel articles and two book on Wales, Holy Ways of Wales and Welsh Railways. He combined humour and poetry in his book All The World's a Pub! (with Bill Tidy illustrations), a celebration of Beer Poetry. He then moved on to crime and historical espionage, aided and encouraged by his wife, Patricia: "If Pat doesn't like it, it's dead".

=== Full time writing ===
Green retired from teaching in the 1990s and became a full-time writer first trying his hand at play writing but on receipt a three-book contract for a crime series settled down as a novelist.

== Personal life ==
Green was married to wife of 53 years, Patricia Green (née Brennan, died 2023) and they have had three children; Dominic, James and Joe. Joe is the founder of charity consultancy firm, Third Sector Network.

Green currently lives in Newark, Nottinghamshire. Green and his family have previously lived in Berwick-upon-Tweed, Telford, Ashby-de-la-Zouch, Sheffield, Leicester and Coventry.

Green's wife, Patricia, suffered a fall which triggered early onset dementia and he became a 24/7 carer (and nothing else) for three years until Pat was taken into care when he became her visitor for seven years until her death. While organising his life around visiting he wife he took up writing again. He wrote for himself and when Pat died tried to take up his writing life again, not as a novelist but as a playwright. He has written several scripts including Prometheus in Chains, an adaptation of Aeschylus's play from a new translation for a modern audience who know little or nothing about Classical Greek Drama of mythology. It was performed at the Cecil Hepworth Playhouse, Walton on Thames, in Oct. '24. His writing continued with the publication in 2025 of a collection of his poetry, St. George's Feast & other poems, edited by Jack Blackmore. Having tried his hand at Greek Tragedy he also took a tilt at Greek Comedy by adapting Aristophanes' Comedy, Frogs, a rehearsed reading of which took place at the Gatehouse Theatre in September 2025.

== Bibliography ==
(incomplete)

- (1976) A Wordhunter's Companion (Prentice Hall) (ISBN 0631938907)
- (2008) Bad Catholics (Luath Press) (ISBN 1906307261)
- (2010) Yesterday's Sins (Luath Press) (ISBN 1906817391)
