= Ashby-de-la-Zouch Town Hall =

Municipal building in Ashby-de-la-Zouch, Leicestershire, England

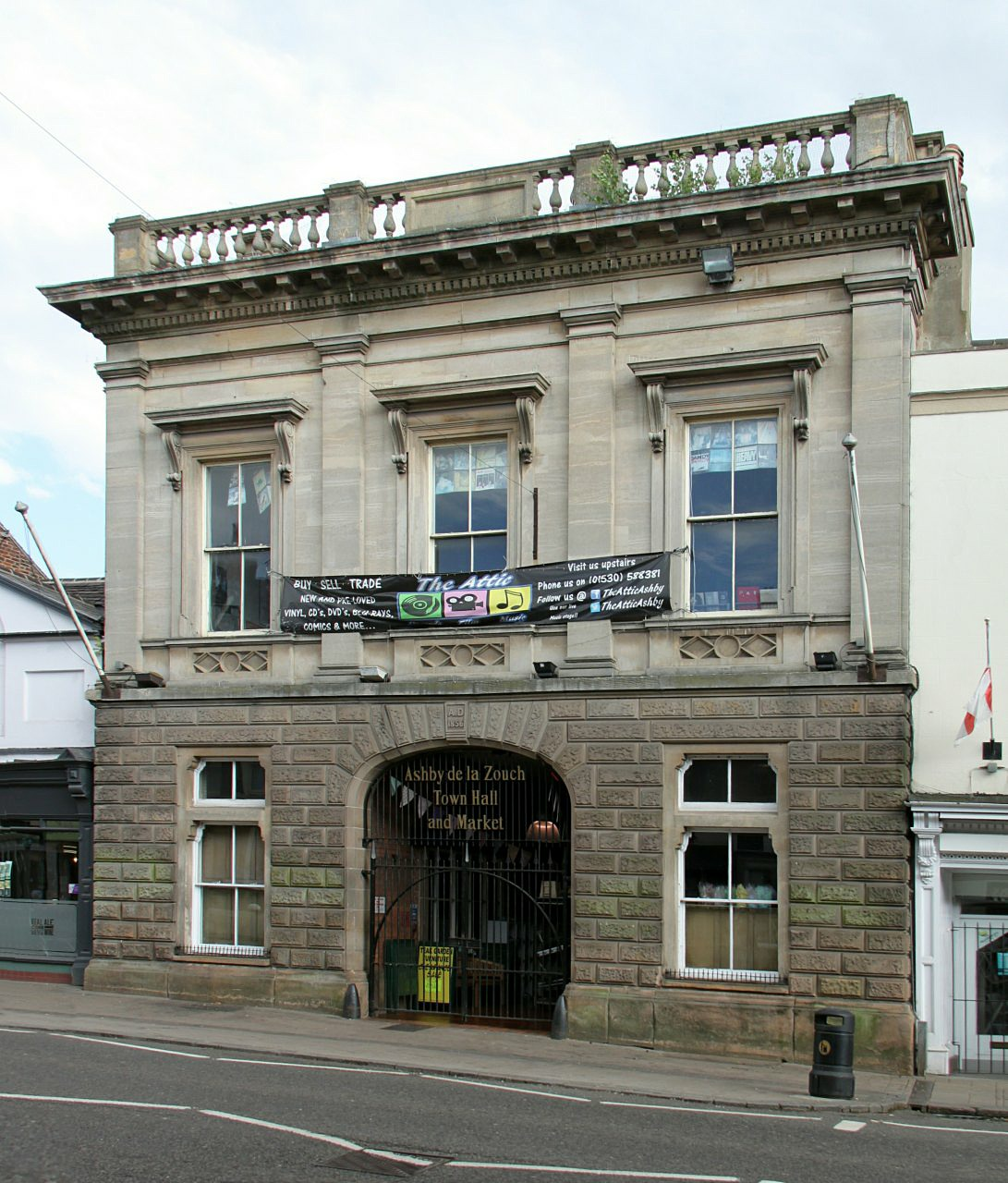
- Ashby-de-la-Zouch Town Hall

- Shown in Leicestershire
- 52.7474°N 1.4701°W
- Location: Market Street, Ashby-de-la-Zouch

History
- Built: 1857

Site notes
- Architect: Henry Isaac Stevens
- Architectural style: Italianate style

Listed Building – Grade II
- Official name: Town Hall
- Designated: 29 September 1977
- Reference no.: 1073608

Ashby-de-la-Zouch Town Hall is a municipal building in Market Street in Ashby-de-la-Zouch, Leicestershire, England. The structure, which was used as the offices of Ashby-de-la-Zouch Urban District Council, is a Grade II listed building. The market hall, which is located behind the town hall, is separately listed.

== History ==
In the first half of the 19th century, petty session hearings were held in a detached building in the grounds of the George Inn in Market Street. After finding this arrangement unsatisfactory, a group of local business leaders decided to form a company to commission a purpose-built complex for holding public meetings, court hearings and markets. The new complex was designed by Henry Isaac Stevens in the Italianate style, built in ashlar stone and was completed in 1857.

The design of the town hall, which was at the front of the complex, involved a symmetrical main frontage with three bays facing onto Market Street. The ground floor, which was rusticated, featured an elliptical opening with a keystone, which provided access to the market hall and was flanked by two sash windows. The first floor was fenestrated by sash windows with brackets supporting cornices; these windows were flanked by pilasters supporting an entablature, a modillioned cornice and a balustrade. Internally, the principal room was the assembly room on the first floor, which became the local venue for both petty session hearings and county court hearings. In October 1859, it was also consecrated as the home of the local freemasons' lodge in the presence of the Provincial Grand Master, Earl Howe. The building was described in Wilson's Imperial Gazetteer as a "noble edifice". The other main part of the complex, the market hall, extended back for 14 bays behind the town hall.

Following a significant increase in population, largely associated with the leather working industry, the area became an urban district with the town hall as its headquarters in 1894. The town hall then continued to serve as the meeting place of the urban district council and as a local venue for civic events for much of the 20th century, but ceased to be the local seat of government when the enlarged North West Leicestershire District Council was formed in 1974. The town hall was subsequently converted for retail use with the first floor room later becoming the showroom of a picture framing business.
