= Selina Hastings (writer) =

British journalist, author and biographer (born 1945)

Lady Selina Hastings FRSL
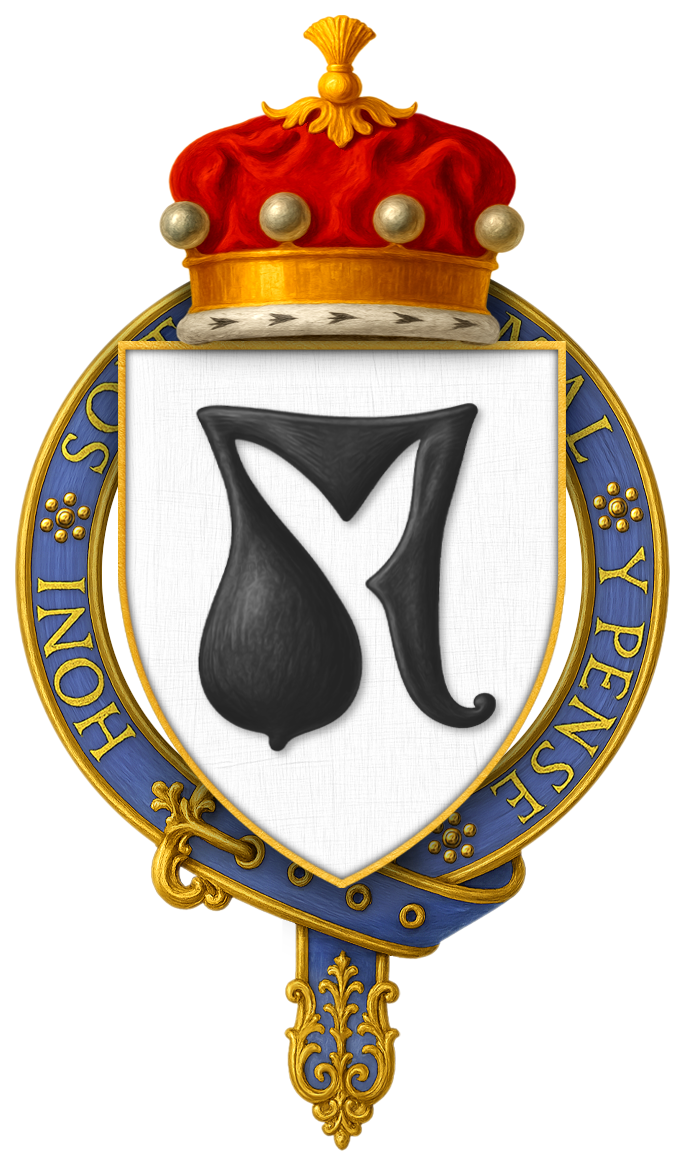
- Coat of arms
- Born: 5 March 1945 (age 81)
- Parents: Francis Hastings, 16th Earl of Huntingdon; Margaret Lane
- Writing career
- Education: St Hugh's College, Oxford (MA)
- Occupations: Journalist; author; biographer
- Notable work: The Red Earl

Lady Selina Shirley Hastings (born 5 March 1945) is a British journalist, author and biographer.

== Biography ==
The elder daughter of Francis, 16th Earl of Huntingdon, by his second marriage to Margaret Lane, Hastings was educated at St Hugh's College, Oxford, where she took an MA degree.

Hastings's books include Sir Gawain and the Loathly Lady (1985), Nancy Mitford (1986), The Singing Ringing Tree, The Man Who Wanted to Live Forever (both 1988), The Firebird, Evelyn Waugh (both 1995), Beibl Lliw Y Plant (1998), Rosamond Lehmann (2002) and The Secret Lives of Somerset Maugham (2010). She is a past recipient of the Marsh Biography Award.

Reviewing her book Nancy Mitford for The New York Times, William McBrien questioned Hastings' sparse documentation of some of the facts in the book. He praised the book for its depiction of that historical period.

Hastings was elected a Fellow of the Royal Society of Literature (FRSL) in 1994. Among others she and her sister, Lady Harriet Shackleton, are in remainder to several ancient English baronies, including those of Hastings and Botreaux.

== See also ==
- Earl of Huntingdon
