= Finger pillory =

Restraint device where the fingers are held in a wooden block

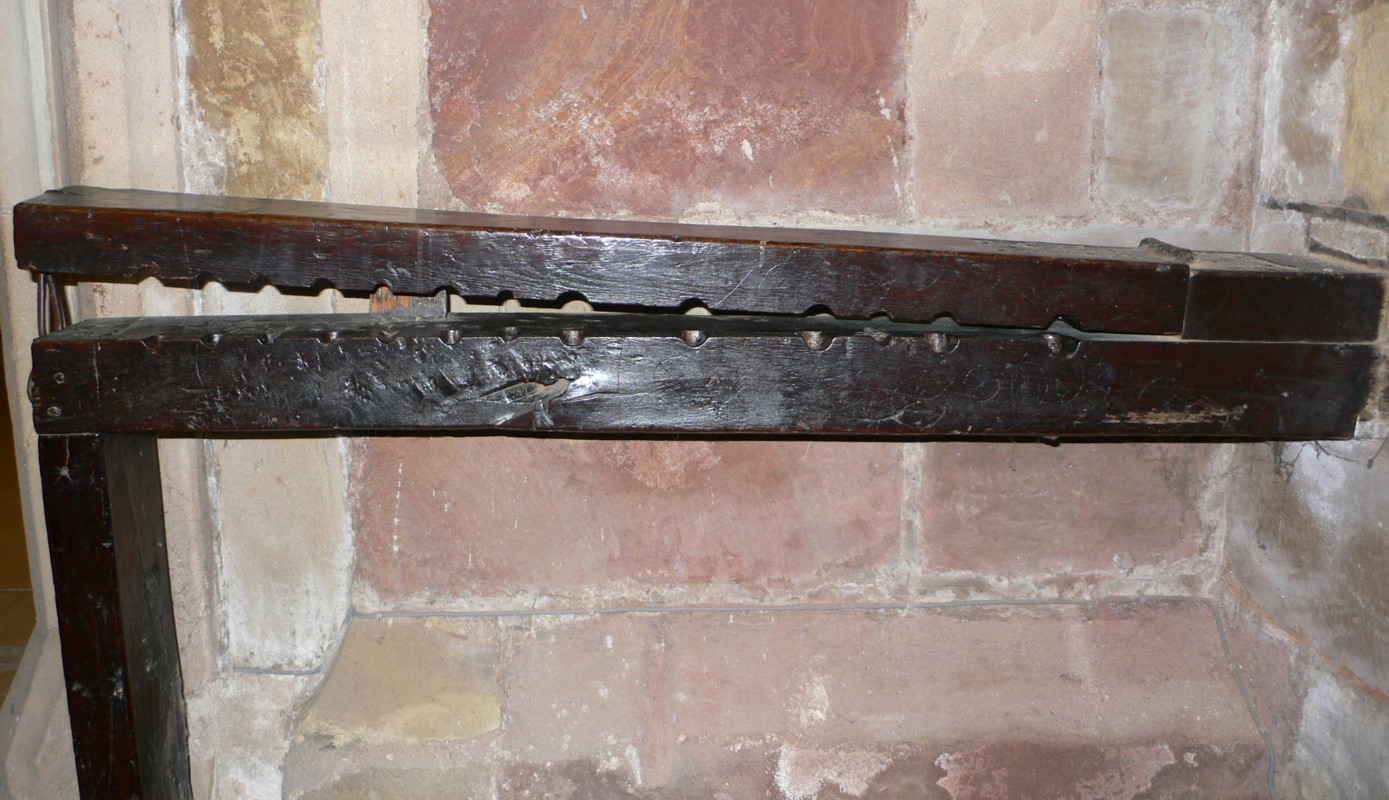
In St Helen's Church, Ashby-de-la-Zouch

A finger pillory is a style of restraint where the fingers are held in a wooden block, using an L-shaped hole to keep the knuckle bent inside the block. The name is taken from the pillory, a much larger device used to secure the head and hands.

Finger stocks were also used in churches for minor offences, such as not paying attention during a sermon. An example still survives in St Helen's Church, Ashby-de-la-Zouch, Leicestershire, England.
