= Francis Hastings, 16th Earl of Huntingdon =

British artist, academic, and Labour politician (1901–90)

The Right Honourable Francis Hastings
- Earl of Huntingdon
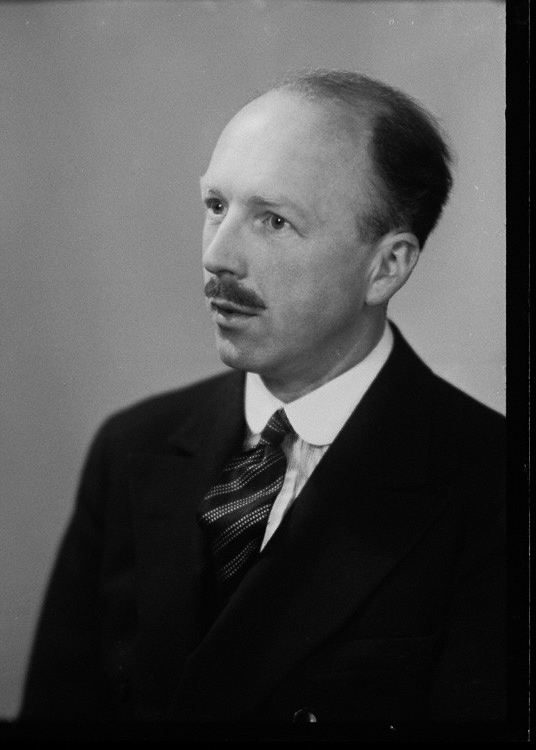
- Portrait of Hastings from an Elliott & Fry half-plate glass negative, 1945. From the collections of the National Portrait Gallery

- Coat of arms
- Predecessor: Warner Hastings
- Successor: William Hastings-Bass
- Full name: Francis Hastings, 16th Earl of Huntingdon
- Born: Francis John Clarence Westenra Plantagenet Hastings; 30 January 1901
- Died: 21 August 1990 (aged 89)
- Buried: St Helen's Church, Ashby-de-la-Zouch
- Wife: Cristina Casati (m. 1925; div. 1943) Margaret Lane (m. 1944)
- Issue: Moorea; Selina; Caroline
- Father: Warner
- Mother: Maud Margaret (née Wilson)
- Education: Slade School of Fine Art
- Notable work: The worker of the future upsetting the economic chaos of the present
- Political party: Labour
- Movement: Muralism
- Board member of: NSMP

Francis John Clarence Westenra Plantagenet Hastings, 16th Earl of Huntingdon (30 January 1901 – 24 August 1990), styled Viscount Hastings until 1939, was a British artist, academic, and later a Labour parliamentarian.

== Background and education ==
The son and heir of Warner Hastings, 15th Earl of Huntingdon, by his wife Maud Margaret (née Wilson), he was educated at Eton College, Christ Church, Oxford, and the Slade School of Art, London. At Oxford, in 1922, he represented its Polo Varsity Team.

== Artistic and academic career ==
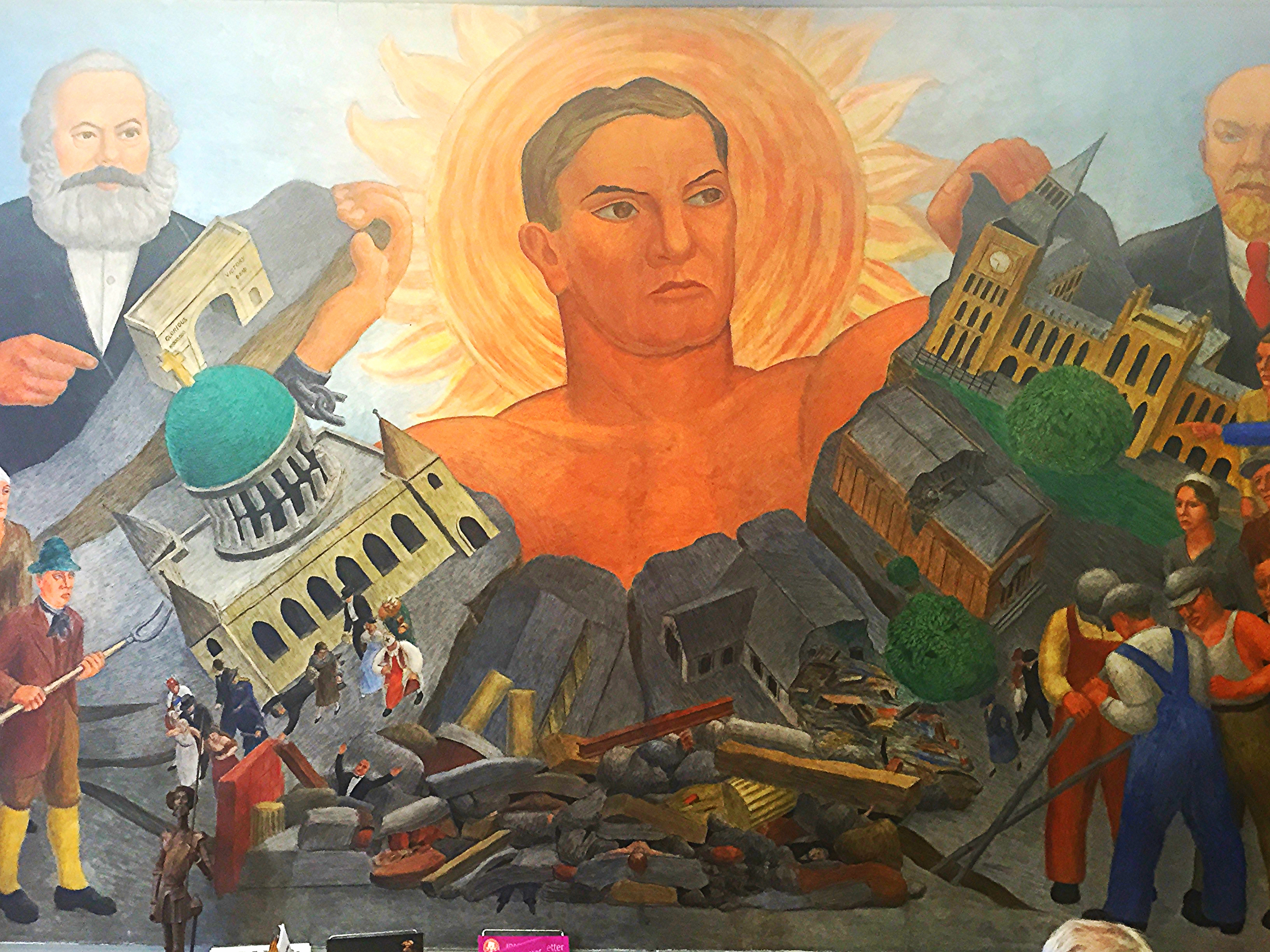
Hastings' mural, The worker of the future upsetting the economic chaos of the present (1935; detail), in the Marx Memorial Library, London

Huntingdon was a pupil of the Mexican mural painter Diego Rivera and held exhibitions notably in London, Paris, Chicago and San Francisco. He was also appointed a professor at the Camberwell College of Arts and the Central School of Arts & Crafts, London. He later served as chairman of the Society of Mural Painters between 1951 and 1958.

== Public life ==
During the Second World War he was Deputy Controller of Defence of the Andover Rural District Council from 1941 to 1945. Huntingdon succeeded in the earldom in 1939 and took his seat on the Labour benches in the House of Lords. He served under Clement Attlee as Parliamentary Secretary to the Ministry of Agriculture and Fisheries from 1945 to 1950.

He was author of The Golden Octopus and Commonsense about India.

In the House of Lords, he often advocated socially liberal policies, supporting abortion rights, the legalisation of assisted dying, and homosexual law reform.

== Family ==
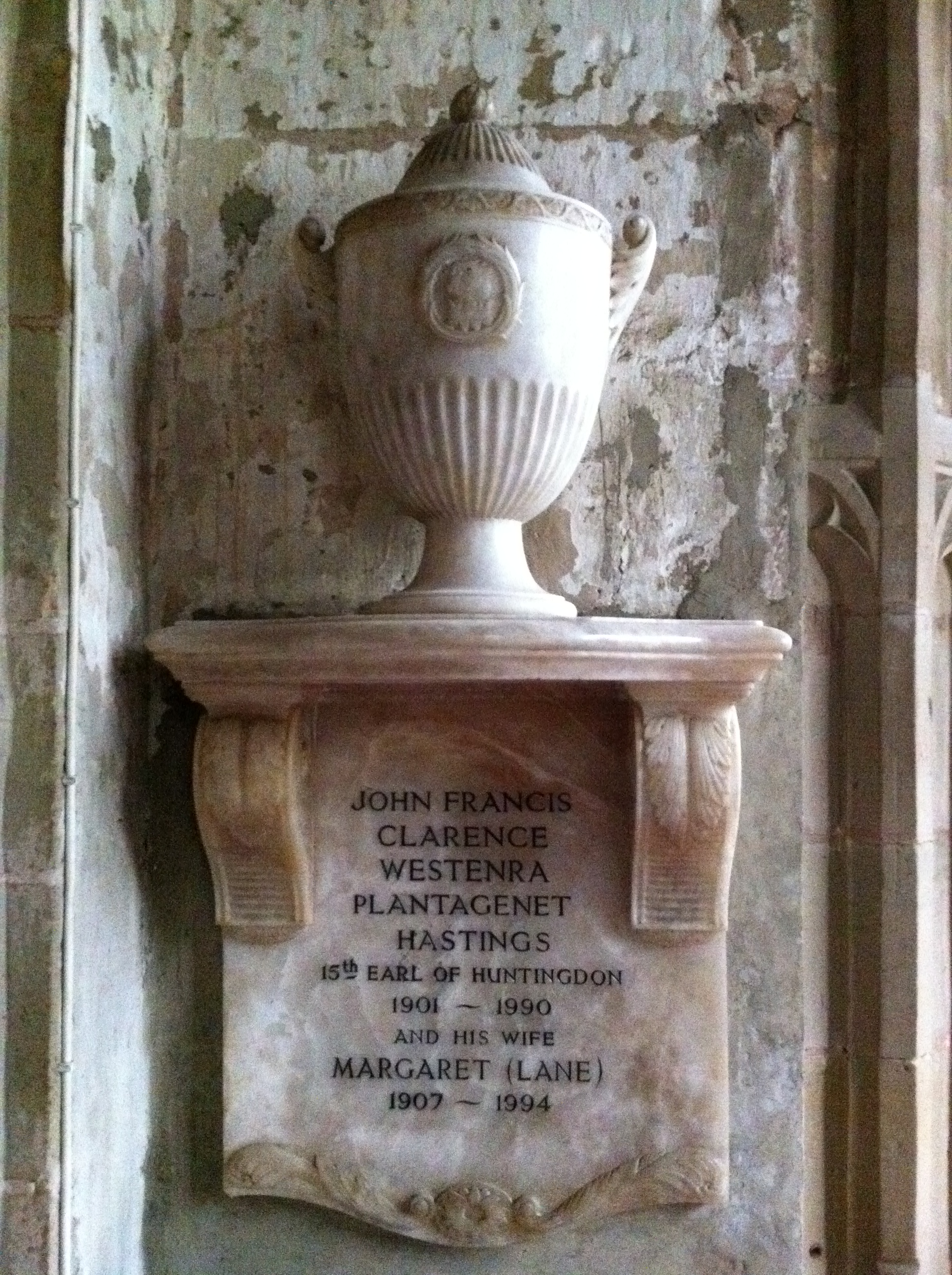
Memorial to the Earl in Ashby Church

Lord Huntingdon's first marriage was to Cristina Casati, daughter of Camillo, Marquis Casati Stampa di Soncino, and his wife, the artistic muse Luisa, in 1925; they had one daughter:

- Lady Moorea Hastings (4 March 1928 – 21 October 2011). She was from 1957 to 1966 the wife of politician and diarist Woodrow, Lord Wyatt of Weeford before marrying the adman Brinsley Black, named as one of the best-dressed Englishmen in the inaugural issue of Men in Vogue in 1965. Lady Moorea, who was famously unmaternal, had one son with each of her husbands:
  - Hon. Pericles Plantagenet James Casati Wyatt (born 1963), became an owner and operator of water parks and recreational vehicle camps in Arizona; half-brother to journalist Petronella Wyatt.
  - Octavius Orlando Irvine Casati Black (born 1968); was at Eton with David Cameron, married to Tory barrister Joanne Cash.

Huntingdon and his first wife divorced in 1943 (Cristina then married Wogan Philipps, 2nd Baron Milford and died in 1953). Huntingdon married secondly Margaret Lane, daughter of Harry George Lane, and former wife of Bryan Wallace, son of the writer Edgar Wallace, in 1944. Lady Huntingdon was a writer and critic and published books on Beatrix Potter, Samuel Johnson and the Brontë sisters. They had two daughters:

- Lady Selina Shirley Hastings (born 5 March 1945).
- Lady Caroline Harriet Hastings (born 12 June 1946).

Lord Huntingdon died in August 1990, aged 89, and was succeeded in the earldom by his first cousin once removed William Edward Robin Hood Hastings-Bass. His wife, Dowager Countess of Huntingdon, died in 1994. In 2014 his daughter Selina, a noted biographer, wrote The Red Earl: The Extraordinary Life of the 16th Earl of Huntingdon.

Political offices
Preceded by Donald Scott; The Duke of Norfolk	Parliamentary Secretary to the Ministry of Agriculture and Fisheries with Percy Collick 1945–1947; George Brown 1947–1950; 1945–1950	Succeeded by George Brown; The Earl of Listowel
Peerage of England
Preceded by Warner Francis John Plantagenet Hastings	Earl of Huntingdon; 1939–1990	Succeeded by William Edward Robin Hood Hastings-Bass
