= St Helen's Church, Ashby-de-la-Zouch =

Church in Ashby de la Zouch in Leicestershire, England

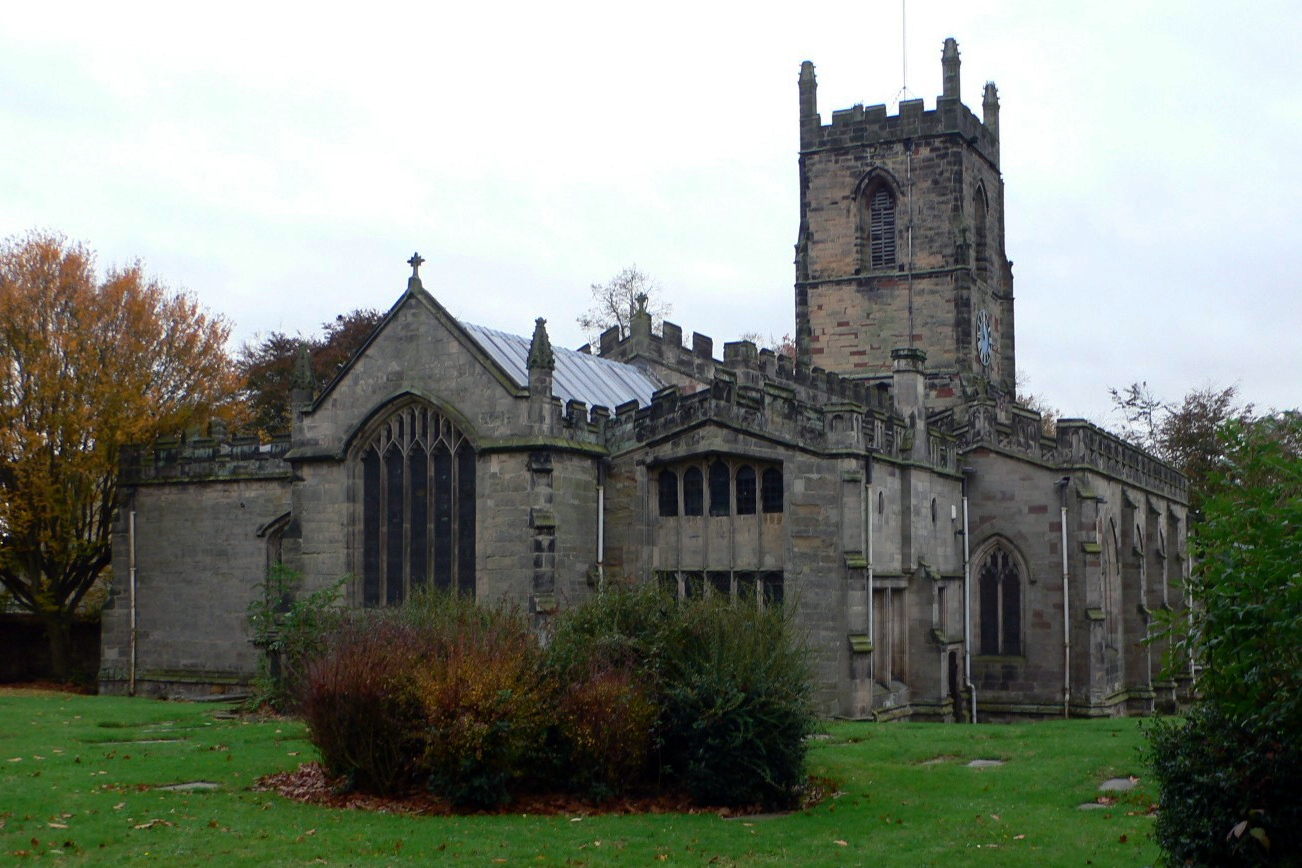
- From the southeast

- Location within Leicestershire
- 52°44′50.4″N 1°28′.8″W
- OS grid reference: SK 36088 16767
- Location: Ashby de la Zouch, Leicestershire
- Country: England
- Denomination: Church of England
- Churchmanship: Broad Church
- Website: http://sthelensashby.net/

History
- Dedication: St. Helen

Architecture
- Heritage designation: Grade I listed building
- Architectural type: English Gothic

Administration
- Province: Canterbury
- Diocese: Diocese of Leicester
- Archdeaconry: Loughborough
- Parish: Ashby-de-la-Zouch

Clergy
- Rector: Rev Canon Sue Field

St Helen's Church is the Anglican parish church of Ashby-de-la-Zouch, in the deanery of North West Leicestershire and the Diocese of Leicester. There was a church in the town in the 11th century, but the core of the present building mainly dates from work started in 1474, when the church was rebuilt by the 1st Baron Hastings at the same time that he converted his neighbouring manor house into a castle. The church was refurbished in about 1670 to create more space, but the large and increasing size of the congregation led to further work in 1829, and a major rebuild in 1878–80, including the widening of the nave by the addition of two outer aisles.

The sandstone church has a tower at the west end, and its nave is wider than it is long due to the extra Victorian aisles. St Helen's Church has some ancient stained glass at the east end, and the Victorian windows on the nave and towers form a coherent narrative of the life of Jesus. Other fixtures include some important funereal monuments, and a font, pulpit and carved heads by Thomas Earp. The finger pillory is a rare item, once seen as a humane form of punishment. The church has a long association with the Hastings family, its patrons for four centuries, and became a centre for Puritanism under the 3rd Earl of Huntingdon. The "Puritan Earl" brought a series of radical figures to the town, including Anthony Gilby and Arthur Hildersham. St Helen's Church is a nationally important building, with a Grade I listing for its exceptional architectural interest.

== History ==
=== Foundation to 1547 ===
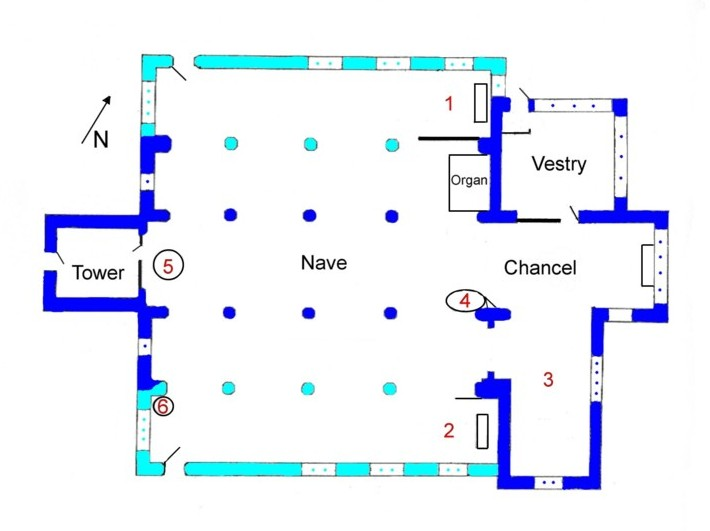
14th–15th century 19th century 1 St Michael & All Angels Chapel; 2 Lady Chapel; 3 Hastings Chapel; 4 pulpit; 5 Earp font; 6 font

There is little documented history of Ashby-de-la-Zouch before the Norman Conquest, although Roman coins were found in the area, and the town's name has both Saxon and Danish elements. It has an entry in the Domesday Book that suggests that it had about 100 inhabitants in 1086, and subsequently grew in importance under its La Zouch and Hastings lords, notably William Hastings.

It is recorded in Domesday that a priest was resident in Ashby, and that the church dedicated to St Helen consisted only of a nave. In about 1144, Philip Beaumains, lord of the Manor of Ashby, granted the church, its lands and revenues to the Augustinian community of Lilleshall Abbey, which retained possession until 1538. A 2013 excavation found evidence of a two-storey vicarage dating from this period, but the building fell into disrepair following the Dissolution of the Monasteries and the site was cleared in the English Civil War of 1642–49.

Parts of the current nave and chancel date from the 14th century, but the church was rebuilt and enlarged by William Hastings in 1474, at the same time that he erected the tower of his nearby castle. The new, larger church included a nave with aisles and chapels adjoining the chancel. The tower, Hastings Chapel, and some buttresses and windows still remain from the 15th century.

=== Reformation and after ===
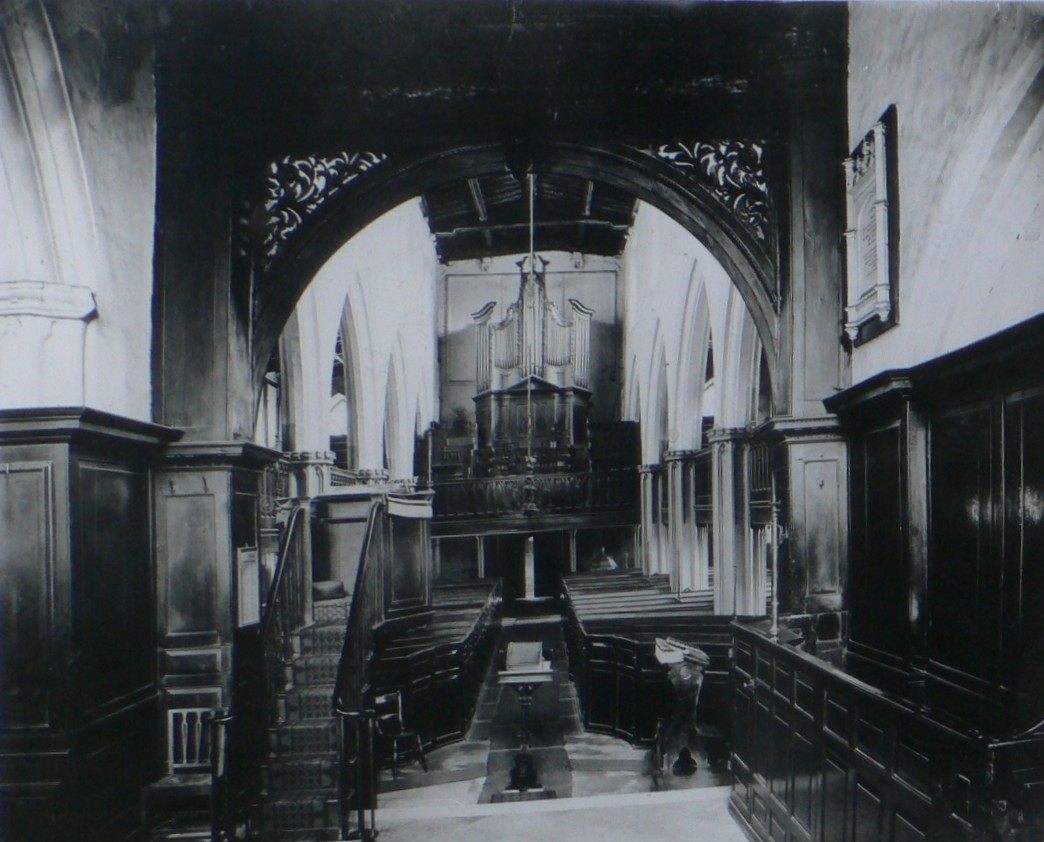
The nave and galleries prior to the 1878 restoration

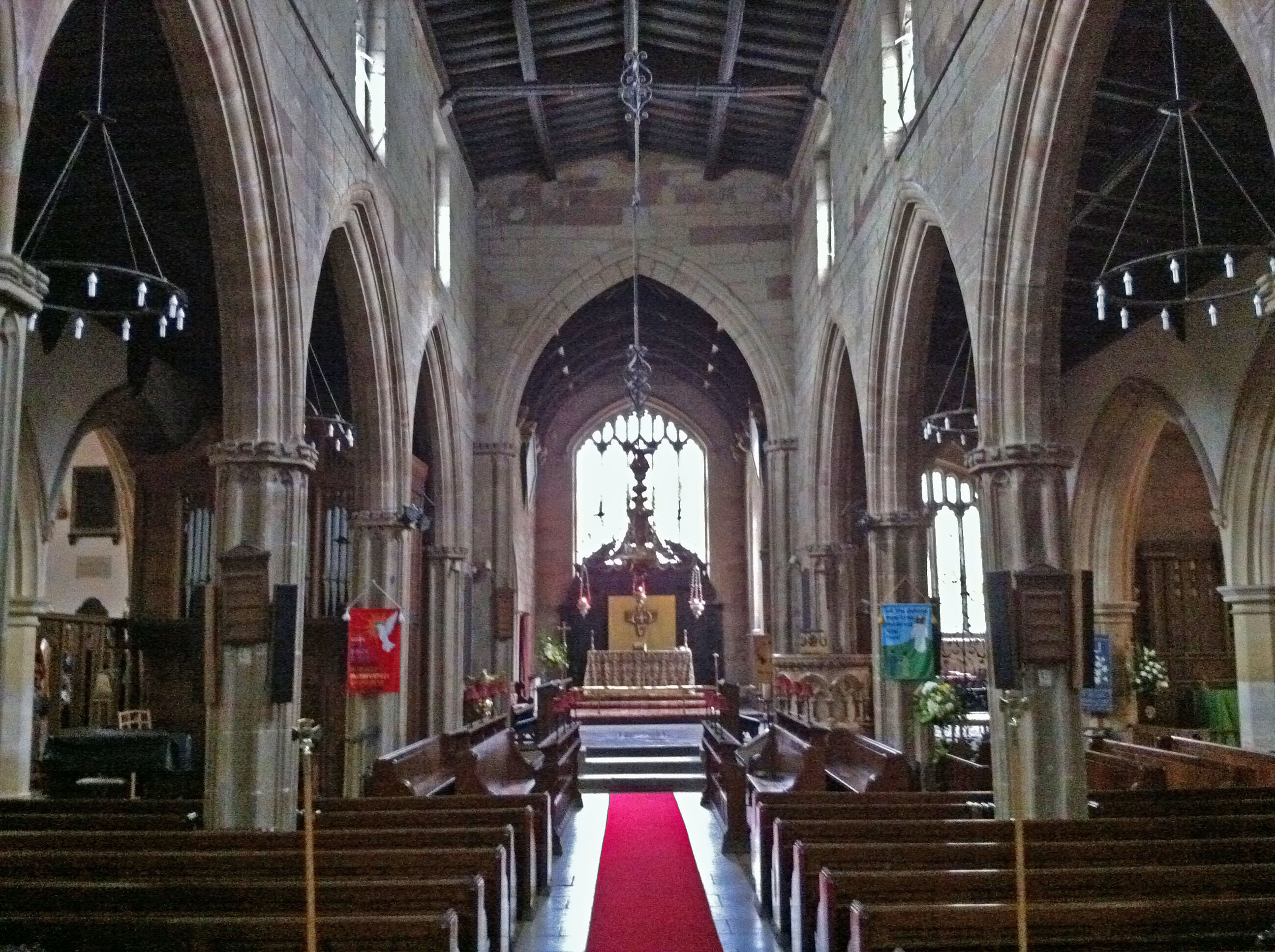
The nave and chancel in 2014

The English Reformation inevitably affected St Helen's Church. Edward VI's 1547 injunction decreed that all images in churches were to be dismantled or destroyed, including stained glass, shrines, roods, statues, and bells, and altars were to be replaced by wooden tables. Damage during the Civil War was minimal, although there are pike marks on the stonework. The church may have been fortified as part of the defences of the castle, a Royalist stronghold.

Around 1670, the church was refurbished, a gallery was built at the western end of the nave, and the carved reredos and a large wooden Royal coat of arms, now at the west end of the nave, were acquired at the same time. An inspection report at the end of the 18th century commented on the dirty transept walls, and the need to install the equivalent of a cattle grid to keep pigs out of the churchyard. Rich crimson hangings in the church had earlier attracted the attention of a thief. The increasing congregation led to the replacement of the pews and the construction of galleries down both sides of the building in 1829, but a more extensive rebuilding was undertaken in 1878–80, by James Piers St Aubyn. The galleries were removed and the two outer aisles were added during this period, a chapel was converted to a vestry and improvements were made to the Hastings Chapel. The cost of these works has been estimated as between £16,000 and more than £18,000 (equivalent to £1,872,200 in 2025). Later developments included the expenditure of £13,000 (equivalent to £198,800 in 2025) between 1963 and 1968 to combat deathwatch beetles found during rewiring, improvements to the heating system, and a rededication in 1974, the quincentenary of the church.

St Helen's Church is the parish church of the English market town of Ashby-de-la-Zouch in Leicestershire. The parish is currently in the deanery of North West Leicestershire, the Diocese of Leicester and the Province of Canterbury.

== Description ==
St Helen's Church has a maximum length of 41.70 metres (136.8 ft) and is aligned at 25° north of east. The majority of English churches have an alignment within a few degrees of east, so this is an exceptionally large deviation from the norm. The sandstone church has a large, mainly 15th-century west tower supported by corner buttresses and topped with battlements and pinnacles. The tower has a four-light window and west doorway, and contains a spiral stairway to the bell and clock chambers and the roof. The chancel is adjoined by the former north chapel (now the vestry) on one side and the Hastings Chapel, set transept-wise on the other; it has three sedilia and a piscina on its northern wall. The nave is significantly wider than it is long, and has four bays with medieval inner north and south aisles and 19th-century outer aisles. The Hastings Chapel, chancel and clerestory are embattled, and the former north chapel is English Perpendicular, with a window of the same style. The piers in the nave were remodelled in the 15th century, and have incised panels, as do some of the arches. This feature is of an unusual style and is also seen at Sherborne Abbey in Dorset and at St Peter and St Paul, Syston, Leicestershire.

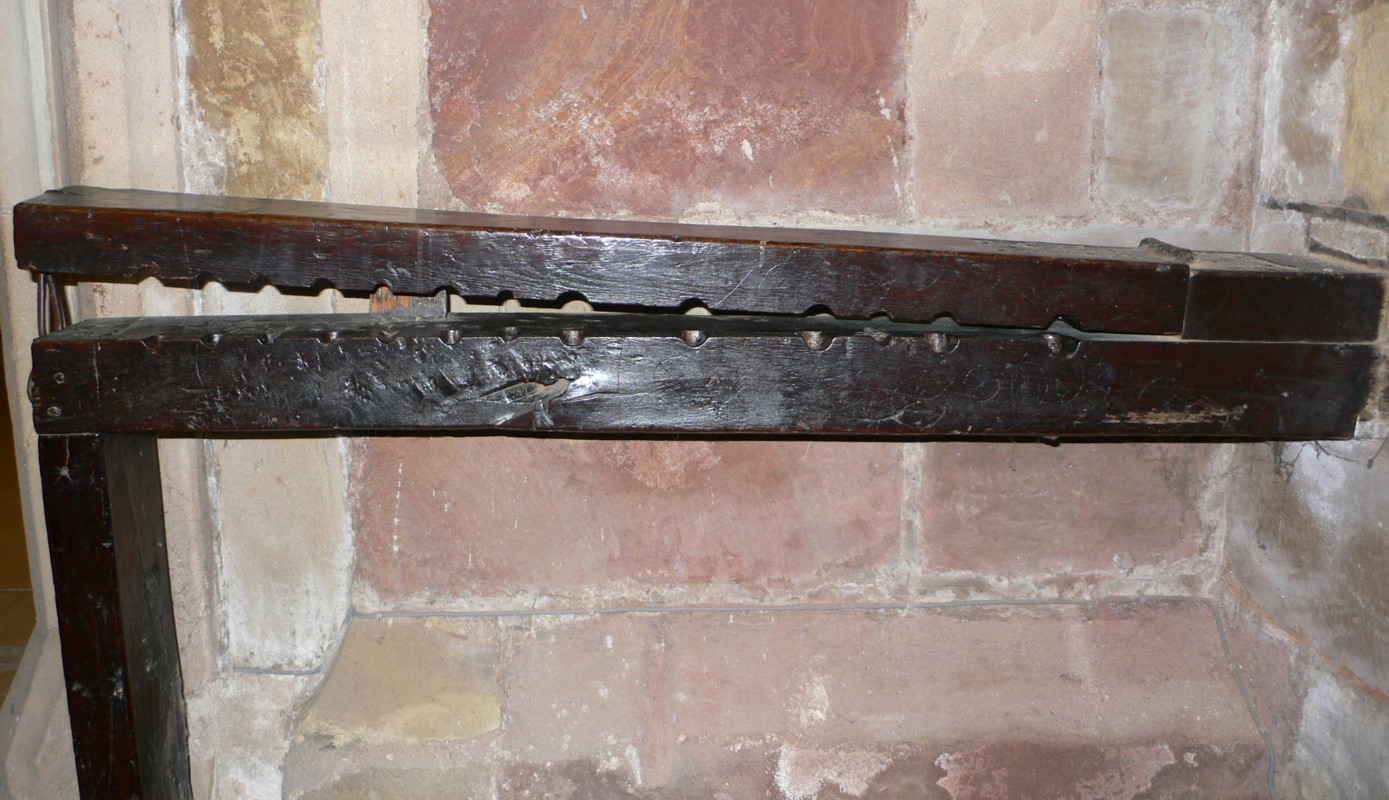
The finger pillory

The Chapel of St Michael and All Angels and the Lady Chapel are at the east end of the outer north and south aisles respectively, and contain 20 of the 28 stone heads carved by Thomas Earp of Lambeth in 1878–1880, mostly depicting biblical characters such as Salome and John the Baptist, or historical figures like St Helen and Martin Luther. Ten are paired on opposite sides of the five pillars defining the inner edge of the Lady Chapel aisle, and another ten are similarly arranged in the Chapel of St Michael and All Angels. The corbels of the north, west and south doors bear six more heads, those by the west door depicting Queen Victoria and Archbishop Tait; and Jesus and Moses are higher on the corbels of the west window. The clerestory and the wooden roofs of the nave and south inner aisle are 15th century, but the rest of the lead-clad roofing dates from the Victorian rebuilding.

St Helen's Church was designated as a Grade I listed building in 1950, recognising it as a building of exceptional interest. It is important not only for the medieval structures that remain, but also for its monuments and fittings. The Victorian restoration is also noted as being of high quality and in keeping with the older parts of the church.

=== Furnishings and fixtures ===
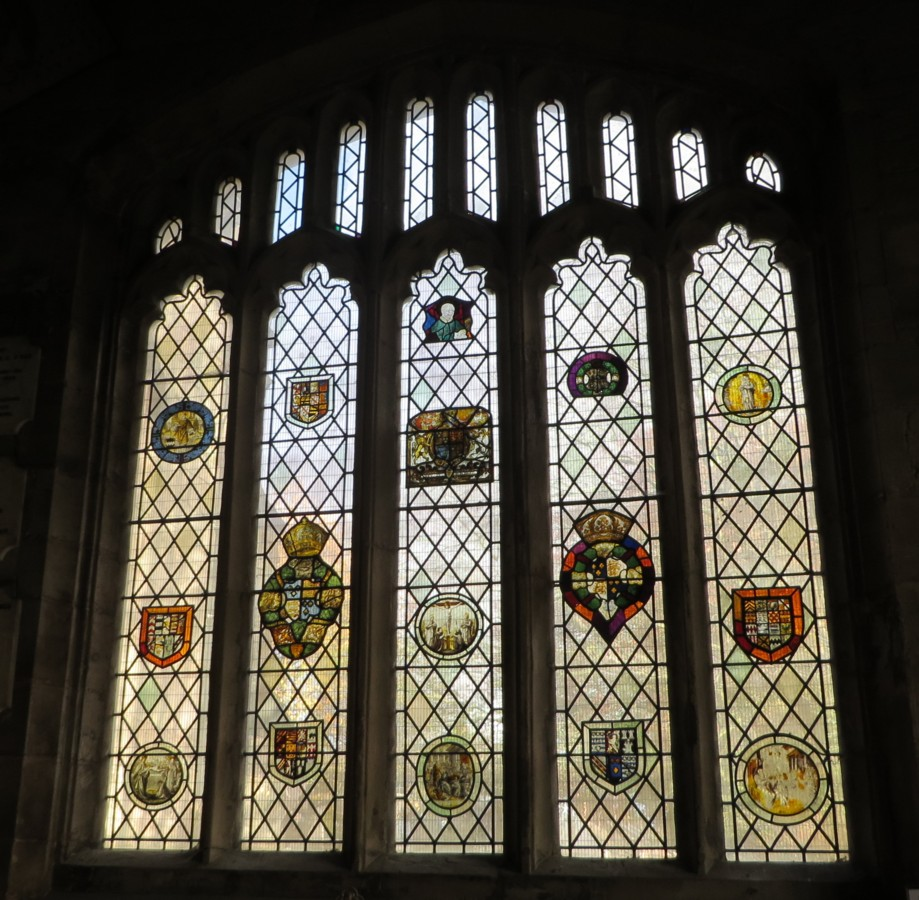
Hastings Chapel east window

The church had much stained glass in 1622 that disappeared during the Reformation. The current eleven coloured glass windows on the north, west and south sides of the church were erected in 1879 by Lavers, Barraud and Westlake, each being named for its donor; the scenes depicted tell the Life of Christ from the Annunciation to the Last Supper. The stained glass in the chancel and the Hasting Chapel was erected in 1924, and most was once in the castle; the earliest glass is a German, Swiss and Flemish work possibly originally from Farleigh Hungerford. The chancel's east window contains arms of Richard I and Edward I and the south window includes "The Magi bearing gifts" and the arms of Catherine Parr. The Hastings Chapel south window has several panels from the 15th and 16th centuries, and one which could possibly be as old as the 13th century. The chapel's east window also has some high quality work, including "The Last Supper". The large west window in the tower is plain glass, as is the clerestory.

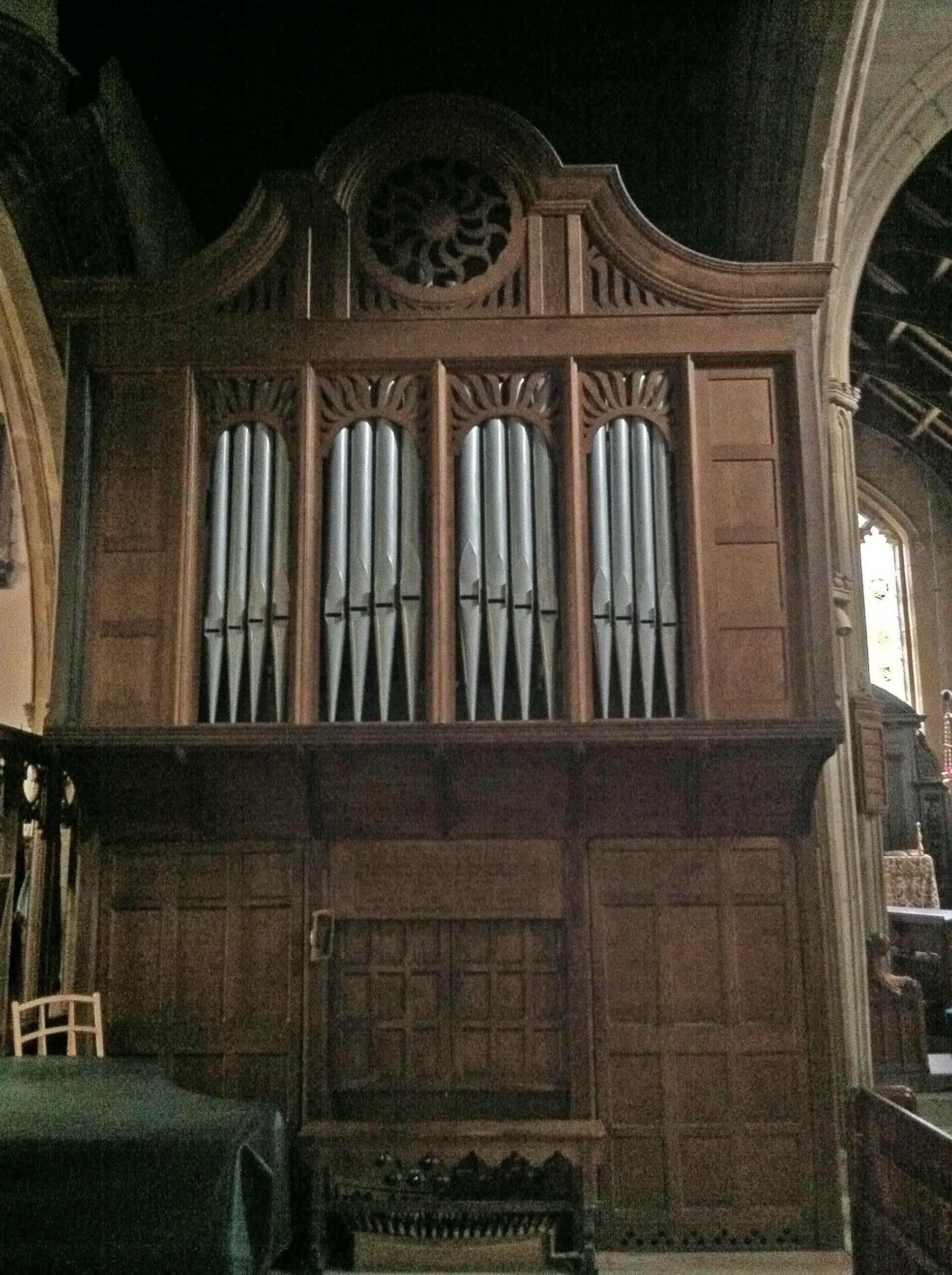
The organ

The rare finger pillory at the west end immobilised offenders without exposing them to the public degradation associated with the stocks. In the centre aisle hangs a large brass candelabrum donated by Leonard Piddocke, High Bailiff of Leicester, in 1733. It is surmounted by a brass dove and was made by William Parsons of London. Some of the branches were stolen in 1776, but soon recovered.

The Baroque wooden reredos of 1679, probably by local man Thomas Sabin, has been compared favourably with the work of Christopher Wren and Grinling Gibbons, and the metal screen also made by an Ashby craftsman, John Staley, is also of high quality. There is a Royal Arms from the reign of Charles II high on the west wall of the nave. The alabaster pulpit and octagonal font were made by Earp in 1878–1880. The font is carved from a single block of stone and decorated on each face with Christian symbols, and rests on red granite pillars on a Portland stone base. The pulpit is similarly supported to match the font. A second, smaller font with a panelled stem is in the southwestern corner of the nave.

The church contains a pipe organ of uncertain date made by Kirkland of London at their Wakefield branch which opened in 1893. Its most recent restorations were in 1935 and 1955. It has three manuals and a pedalboard, and is described on the National Pipe Organ Register as being of an "unusual" type.

There is a north-facing clock on the tower, and a sundial on the south side which was rediscovered and repaired in 2000. The masonry shows that it was built at the same time as that part of the tower. The tower holds a ring originally of eight bells; the earliest dates back to 1571, but was recast in 1849, and all eight bells were repaired by John Taylor & Co in 1886. The bells were repaired and rehung again in 2006 using £42,600 of National Lottery funding awarded from the Heritage Lottery Fund. The tenor bell was recast, and two new trebles were made, bringing the total to ten; prior to the last recasting, the large tenor bell weighed 902 kilograms (1,989 lb).

=== Hastings Chapel and memorials ===
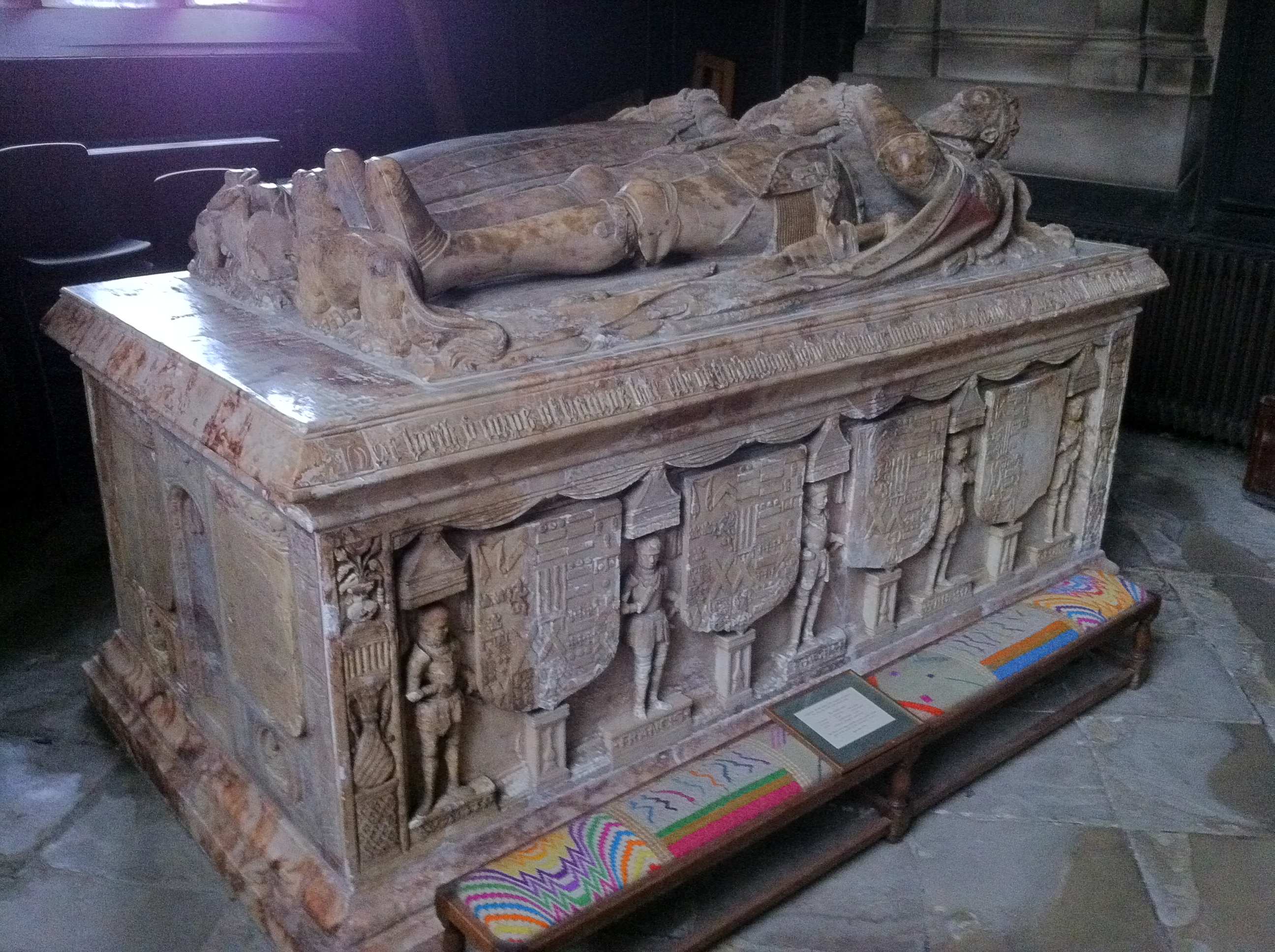
Alabaster tomb to Francis Hastings, 2nd Earl of Huntingdon

The Hastings Chapel contains a number of family monuments, including a large alabaster tomb for Francis Hastings, 2nd Earl of Huntingdon, who died in 1561, and his countess, Catherine. The monument was carved by Joseph Pickford to a design by William Kent. A memorial to Theophilus Hastings, 9th Earl of Huntingdon, who died in 1746, is on the east wall and is by Michael Rysbrack. His widow, Selina, founded a training college for evangelical ministers, and a sculpture of her in mourning, also by Rysbrack, is placed by her husband's memorial. The countess herself is remembered through a large brass plaque in the chancel floor. The larger of two vaults containing the coffins of the Hastings family lies beneath the chancel, and the smaller and older one is under their chapel.

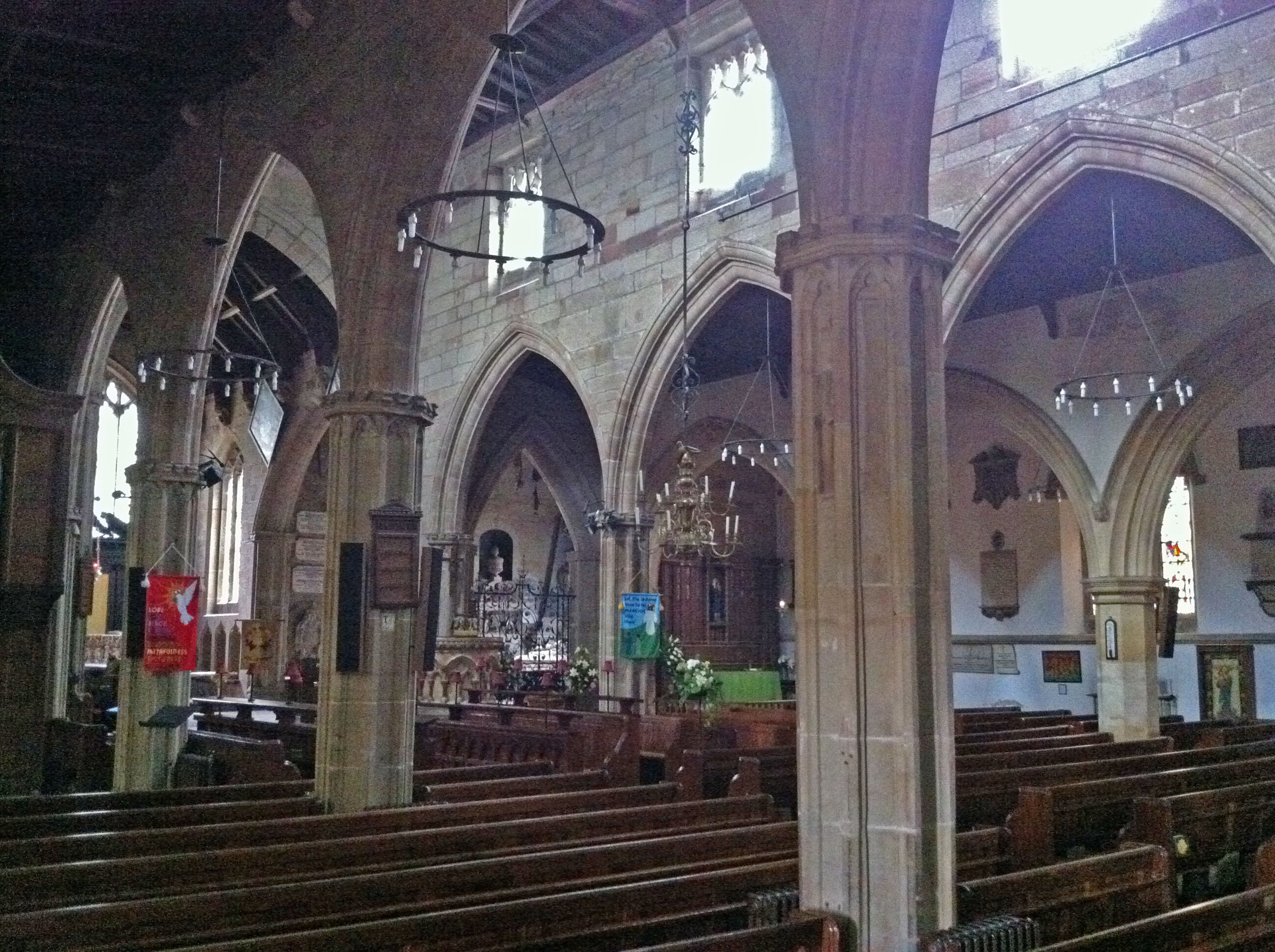
The 1474 columns, with the Victorian piers further back. In the background, from left to right, are parts of the chancel, Hastings Chapel and Lady Chapel

The Lady Chapel contains a wall memorial to Arthur Hildersham and a painted wooden bust of Margery Wright, who died in 1623. The inscription below records that she had given £43 (equivalent to £9,100 in 2025) to provide gowns for the old and needy of the town. The Chapel of St Michael and All Angel has a recumbent alabaster effigy known as "the Pilgrim". The subject holds a pilgrim's staff and other symbols such as a wide hat with cockle shells. A dog lies at his feet. The 15th-century figure was originally brightly painted, and depicts a person of noble birth. It is believed to represent Thomas, the third brother of William Hastings. A number of carved alabaster memorial slabs were removed when the church was re-pewed in 1829. Only one survives, a memorial to Robert Mundy, who died in 1526, and his two wives, both named Elizabeth; it now stands upright by the west wall.

The arch gateway at the western end of the churchyard bears a skull and crossbones at the top of each pillar. The memorials in the churchyard are mainly dated 1750–1850, and most are lined against the churchyard's south wall or are flush with the ground. Some show fine carving, commensurate with commercial success. They include the memorials of French-born wine merchant Jean Gaudin and the Litherland brothers, founders of Royal Crown Derby. From 1804, French prisoners of war were quartered in Ashby, and those who died before their release, or who stayed and married local women, are also buried in the churchyard. A group of memorials are for members of a prosperous local family, the Mammatts. Edward Mammatt, church organist for 40 years and a successful scientist despite being blinded at age six, also has a monument in the church, and one of the Victorian windows is dedicated to his widow by their sons.

== Other burials ==
- Henry Hastings, 3rd Earl of Huntingdon
- George Hastings, 4th Earl of Huntingdon
- Francis Hastings (died 1595)
- Ferdinando Hastings, 6th Earl of Huntingdon
- Theophilus Hastings, 7th Earl of Huntingdon
- Francis Hastings, 16th Earl of Huntingdon and his wife Margaret Lane
- Katherine Neville, Baroness Hastings (within the Lady Chapel)
- Elizabeth Stanley, Countess of Huntingdon

== People ==
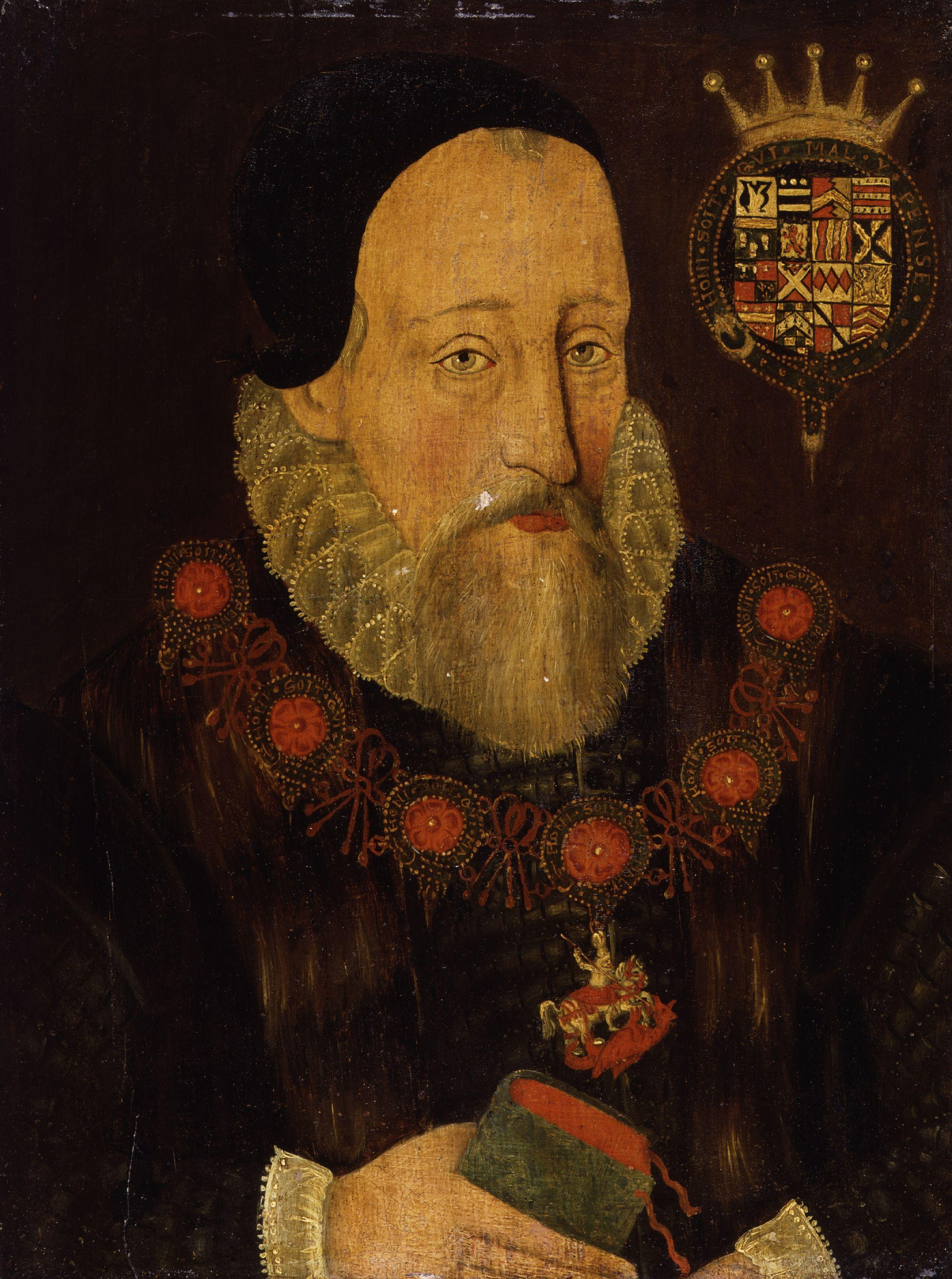
Henry Hastings by an unknown artist at the National Portrait Gallery, London

The advowson of St Helen's Church, including the right to nominate the vicar, was owned by Lilleshall Abbey until 1508, when it passed to the Bishop of Coventry and Lichfield. The Dissolution of the Monasteries led to the transfer of the patronage to Francis Hastings, the 2nd Earl of Huntingdon, and it remained with the Hastings family until 1931, passing then to John G. Shields and his descendants. The names of the vicars are known back to Roger in 1200.

Henry Hastings, the third earl, was a zealous promoter of puritanism and founded Ashby Grammar School to provide education in accordance with his religious views. Anthony Gilby had lived in exile in Geneva during the reign of Mary, but was invited to Ashby by the earl and made the town a nationally important centre for radical Protestantism. Attempts by the church authorities to discipline him failed, and he died after 25 years spent preaching and pamphleteering. Hastings' influence meant that between 1562 and 1632 Ashby had a succession of Puritan ministers. The last of these was Arthur Hildersham, another influential figure who sought to internationalise radical Protestantism, but became vulnerable to the strictures of his bishop after Henry Hastings died in 1595. Hildersham was barred from preaching or deprived of his living for 17 of the 38 years of his incumbency, Earl Henry was interred in St Helen's after a lavish funeral befitting his status as Lord President of the Council of the North.

== Services and congregation ==
As of 2017, the church is managed as part of the "Ashby and Breedon Team Ministry", which also includes Holy Trinity, Ashby-de-la-Zouch; The Priory Church of Saint Mary and Saint Hardulph, Breedon on the Hill; St Mary the Virgin, Coleorton; St John's Chapel, Coleorton; All Saints Church, Isley Walton and St Matthew's Church, Worthington. The church operates "Little Fishes", a mother and toddler group, and its street pastors work in outreach and liaison with the town community.

The Ashe lectures, endowed by Francis Ashe in 1654, provided for weekly lectures in the church by a "godly, orthodox and ordained minister". This was later amended to allow for at least one lecture each year. Twentieth-century lecturers include Geoffrey Fisher, Donald Coggan, Donald Soper and George Carey.

== Parish library ==
The parish library consists of 680 books acquired by the parish priests, and was also augmented by two large bequests. The earliest text dates from 1493. The majority of books cover theological topics, and are printed in Latin, Greek and English. The collection is part of Manuscripts and Special Collections at the University of Nottingham.

== Heritage project ==
In 2014, the Heritage Lottery Fund awarded £648,300 to the St Helen's Heritage Project. The grant was to finance a three-year project to build a Heritage Centre opposite the south side of the church. When completed, the Heritage Centre will have a display area, kitchen, rooms for hire and a garden. The church plans to have trained guides and visitor activities, and to offer craft courses in, for example, calligraphy and stone carving.

The project's preparatory 2013 archaeological dig that discovered the vicarage ruins also unearthed the remains of a tithe barn, trenches from the Civil War and parts of a causeway, along with smaller domestic items.

== Cited texts ==
- Abney-Hastings, Peter (2002). Rambles in St Helen's Churchyard. Ashby-de-la-Zouch: Ashby-de-la-Zouch Museum.
- Braddick, Michael (2009). God's Fury, England's Fire: a new history of the English Civil Wars. London: Penguin. ISBN 978-0-14-100897-4.
- Cross, Claire (1966). The Puritan Earl, the life of Henry Hastings, Third Earl of Huntingdon, 1536–1595. London: Macmillan.
- Haigh, Christopher (1987). The English Reformation Revised. Cambridge: Cambridge University Press. ISBN 0-521-33631-7.
- Hillier, Kenneth (1984). The Book of Ashby-de-la-Zouch. Buckingham: Baron. ISBN 978-0-86023-217-9.
- Hillier, Kenneth (2010). Ashby-de-la-Zouch and the Great Civil War. Ashby-de-la-Zouch: Ashby-de-la-Zouch Museum. ISBN 978-0-9547799-4-8.
- Nye, Thelma M. (1965). Parish church architecture. London: Batsford.
- Pevsner, Nikolaus; Williamson, Elizabeth (1984). Leicestershire and Rutland (Pevsner Architectural Guides: Buildings of England). New Haven CT: Yale University Press. ISBN 978-0-300-09618-7.
- Scott, W. (1975) [1907]. The Story of Ashby-de-la-Zouch. London: White Lion.
- West, John Ebenezer (1899). Cathedral Organists Past and Present. London: Novello.
- Williams, Richard H. (1980). The Parish Church of St Helen Ashby-de-la-Zouch: a History and Guide. Ashby-de-la-Zouch: G. C. Frost.
