= Hastings (name) =

Hastings is a surname of English and Irish origin, and is used also as a given name.

== Surnames ==
As a surname Hastings may sometimes be a patronymic surname from the Anglo-Norman personal name Hasting (also Hastain), but is usually a toponymic surname from Hastings in Sussex.

Separately also a common surname in Connacht Ireland, where it is thought to often be a rough phonetic Anglicization of the Irish Gaelic sept of Ó hOistín who were followers of the MacDermots of Moylurg, first Anglicized as Hestin and Histon, then later Hastings. John O'Hart in his work "The origin and stem of the Irish nation" published 1892, states the Irish Hastings origin is from the ancient Irish Gaelic name O'h-Uisgin, other possible Irish sources may derive from a Norse Gaelic personal name Oistín or a phonetic version of Ó hOissín another old Connacht Irish surname, a family name that can sound regionally similar when said in original Irish. This family are most prominent in County Mayo, County Limerick, County Kerry and County Clare.

== List of people surnamed Hastings ==
- Adam Hastings, British musician and member of Beatles tribute bands The Bootleg Beatles and The Fab Four
- Alan Hastings, American theoretical ecologist
- Alcee Hastings (1936–2021), US congressman from Florida
- Amy-Joyce Hastings Irish actress
- Anne Hastings (disambiguation), several people
- Barbara Huddleston Abney-Hastings, 13th Countess of Loudoun (1919–2002)
- Barbara Rawdon-Hastings, Marchioness of Hastings (1810–1858), fossil collector and geologist
- Basil Macdonald Hastings (1881–1928), British author, playwright and journalist, father of Macdonald, grandfather of Max
- Bill Hastings (footballer) (1888– after 1919), English footballer
- Bill Hastings (judge) (born 1957), Canadian-New Zealand censor and judge
- Bob Hastings (1925–2014), American actor
- Brian Hastings (born 1940), New Zealand cricketer
- Brian Hastings (poker player) (born 1988), American poker player
- Charles Hastings (disambiguation), several people
- Chris Hastings (disambiguation), several people
- Christopher Hastings (born c. 1983), American comics writer and artist
- Clare Hastings, British author, fashion journalist, stylist and costume designer
- Clifford C. Hastings (1882–1946), American politician from New York
- Cuyler Hastings (c. 1864–1914), American stage actor, played Sherlock Holmes
- Daniel Hastings (disambiguation), several people
- Doc Hastings (born 1941), American politician from Washington
- Don Hastings (born 1934), American actor
- Edith Abney-Hastings, 12th Countess of Loudoun (1883–1960)
- Edith Rawdon-Hastings, 10th Countess of Loudoun (1833–1874)
- Edward Hastings (disambiguation), several people
- Edwin George Hastings (1872–1953), American agricultural bacteriologist
- Elizabeth Hastings (disambiguation), several people
- Ernest Hastings (1879–1940), English entertainer
- Ferdinando Hastings, 6th Earl of Huntingdon (1609–1656)
- Lady Flora Hastings (1806–1839)
- Francis Hastings (disambiguation), several people
- Frank Abney Hastings (1794–1828)
- Fred W. Hastings, American politician
- Gavin Hastings (born 1962), Scottish rugby player
- George Hastings (disambiguation), several people
- Hans Francis Hastings, 12th Earl of Huntingdon (1779–1828), British navy officer
- Henry Hastings (disambiguation), several people
- James Hastings (1852–1922), Scottish theologian
- James F. Hastings (1926–2014), American politician from New York
- Jay Hastings (1878–1939), American politician from Nebraska
- Jimmy Hastings (born 1938), British musician
- John Hastings (disambiguation), several people
- Jordan Hastings (born 1982), Canadian musician
- Katherine Hastings, American poet
- Katherine Hastings, Countess of Huntingdon (died 1620)
- Kevin Hastings (born 1957), Australian rugby player
- Lansford Hastings (1819–1870)
- Laurence Hastings, 1st Earl of Pembroke (1319–1348)
- Liz Jamieson-Hastings (1944–2022), New Zealand addiction counsellor
- Macdonald Hastings (1909–1982), British journalist
- Mardi Hastings, American mechanical and acoustical engineer
- Mary Hastings (c. 1552 - c. 1589), English courtier and suggested wife of Ivan the Terrible
- Sir Max Hastings (born 1945), British journalist
- Meredith G. Hastings, American atmospheric chemist
- Michael Hastings (disambiguation), several people
- Milo Hastings (1884–1957), American author and inventor
- Natasha Hastings (born 1986), American sprinter
- Natasha Hastings (writer), British author
- Sir Patrick Hastings (1880–1952), English barrister
- Paul P. Hastings (1872–1947), American railroad executive
- Rachel Hastings (born 1997), Northern Ireland musician known professionally as Milkie Way
- Reed Hastings (born 1960), founder of Netflix
- Richard Hastings (disambiguation), several people
- Scott Hastings (disambiguation), several people
- Selina Hastings, Countess of Huntingdon (1707–1791)
- Selina Hastings (born 1945), British biographer and journalist
- Serranus Clinton Hastings (1814–1893), American politician from Iowa
- Seth Hastings (1762–1831), American politician from Massachusetts
- Simon Abney-Hastings, 15th Earl of Loudoun (born 1974)
- Smith H. Hastings (1843–1905) Union Col. and Medal of Honor winner, see List of American Civil War Medal of Honor recipients: G–L
- Somerville Hastings (1878–1967) English surgeon, socialist and Member of Parliament
- Sir Stephen Hastings (1921–2005), British MP
- Theophilus Hastings, 7th Earl of Huntingdon (1650–1701)
- Theophilus Hastings, 9th Earl of Huntingdon (1696–1746)
- Thomas Hastings (disambiguation), several people
- W. K. Hastings (1930–2016), Canadian statistician
- Warner Hastings, 15th Earl of Huntingdon (1868–1939)
- Warren Hastings (1732–1818), first Governor-General of India
- Warren E. Hastings (1887–1970), American politician and locomotive engineer
- Will Hastings (born 1996), American football player
- William Hastings (disambiguation), several people

=== Fictional ===
- Arthur Hastings, a character in Agatha Christie novels
- Shaun Hastings, a character in the Assassin's Creed video game series.
- Spencer Hastings, main character in the ABC Family television series Pretty Little Liars and in the novel of the same name.
- Ted Hastings, the Superintendent in charge of AC-12 in the BBC's Line of Duty

== People with the given name Hastings ==
- Hastings Ismay, 1st Baron Ismay (1887–1965), first Secretary General of NATO
- Hastings Banda (1898–1997), prime minister and president of Malawi
- Hastings Edward Harrington (1832–1861), English recipient of the Victoria Cross
- Hastings Keith (1915–2005), US congressman from Massachusetts
- Hastings Lees-Smith (1878–1941), English Member of Parliament
- Hastings Rashdall (1858–1924), English philosopher
- Hastings Russell, 12th Duke of Bedford (1888–1953)
- Sir Hastings Yelverton (1808–1878), British admiral

== See also ==
- Baron Hastings
- Hastings was the surname of some of the D'Oyly baronets
- Hastings was the surname of the Earl of Huntingdon
- Abney-Hastings
