= Kerr & Co =

William B. Kerr Co.

- Industry: Jewellers and silversmiths
- Founded: 1855 in Newark, New Jersey, United States
- Headquarters: Newark, New Jersey, United States
- Products: Jewelry; Tableware; Gifts and Accessories; Silver items

William B. Kerr Co. was an American manufacturer of jewelry, flatware and hollow-ware. Established in Newark, New Jersey in 1855, they are listed in the 1915 Edition of the Trademarks of the Jewelry and Kindred Trades as having been located at 144 Orange Street.

== Hallmark ==
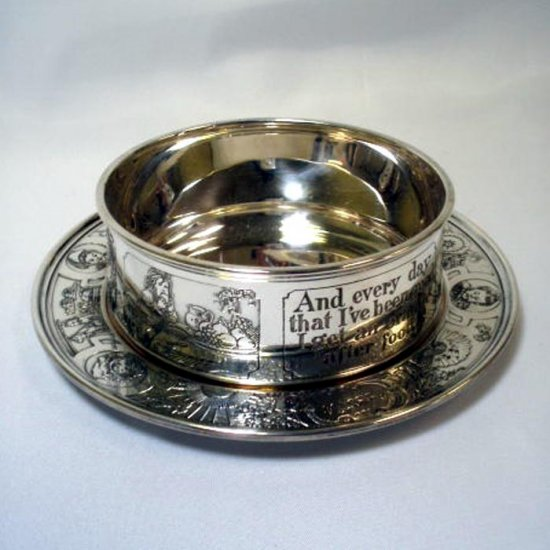
Silver bowl and plate for children.

Kerr's hallmark was a fasces - a single-bit axe with rods bound with straps. They used this trademark of a medieval axe from 1855 until 1892. Other hallmarks include a hammer, and three "X" marks. William B. Kerr & Co. newark, New Jersey Ca. 1880s - 1927 Well regarded for Art Nouveau jewelry, holloware and vanity items. Absorbed into Gorham in 1927.

== Styles ==
Kerr was known for elaborate and unique Art Nouveau pieces, most especially the American Beauty series, as well as many different patterns of flatware and holloware for children featuring nursery rhymes and images.

== Sale to Gorham ==
An Art Nouveau brooch, c. 1900.

William B. Kerr & Co was sold to Gorham Manufacturing Company. Gorham was purchased by Textron in 1967. Gorham was owned by Brown-Forman Corporation from 1991 to 2005 until it was sold to Department 56 in the Lenox holdings transaction.

== Notes and references ==
- "Silver in America, 1840-1940" - Magazine Antiques, December 1994 by Charles L. Venable
- Gorham Silver, 1831-1981 - N.Y., Dodd, Mead, 1983, by Charles H. Carpenter
