= Thomas Hastings =

Thomas Hastings may refer to:

- Thomas Hastings (colonist) (1605–1685), English immigrant to New England
- Thomas Hastings (composer) (1784–1872), American composer, primarily of hymn tunes
- Thomas Hastings (cricketer) (1865–1938), Australian cricketer
- Thomas Hastings (Royal Navy officer) (1790–1870), British innovator, instructor, and Royal Navy officer
- Thomas Horace Hastings, namesake of Hastings, Florida
- Thomas Hastings (architect) (1860–1929), American architect
- Thomas N. Hastings (1858–1907), American politician and architect
- Thomas Hastings (priest) (1733–1794), clergyman in the Church of Ireland
- Thomas Hastings (MP), Member of Parliament for Leicestershire

== See also ==
- Thomas Hoo, Baron Hoo and Hastings (died 1455), Knight of the Garter and English courtier
- Hastings (name)
