= Martelé (silver) =

Hand-wrought production line of silver

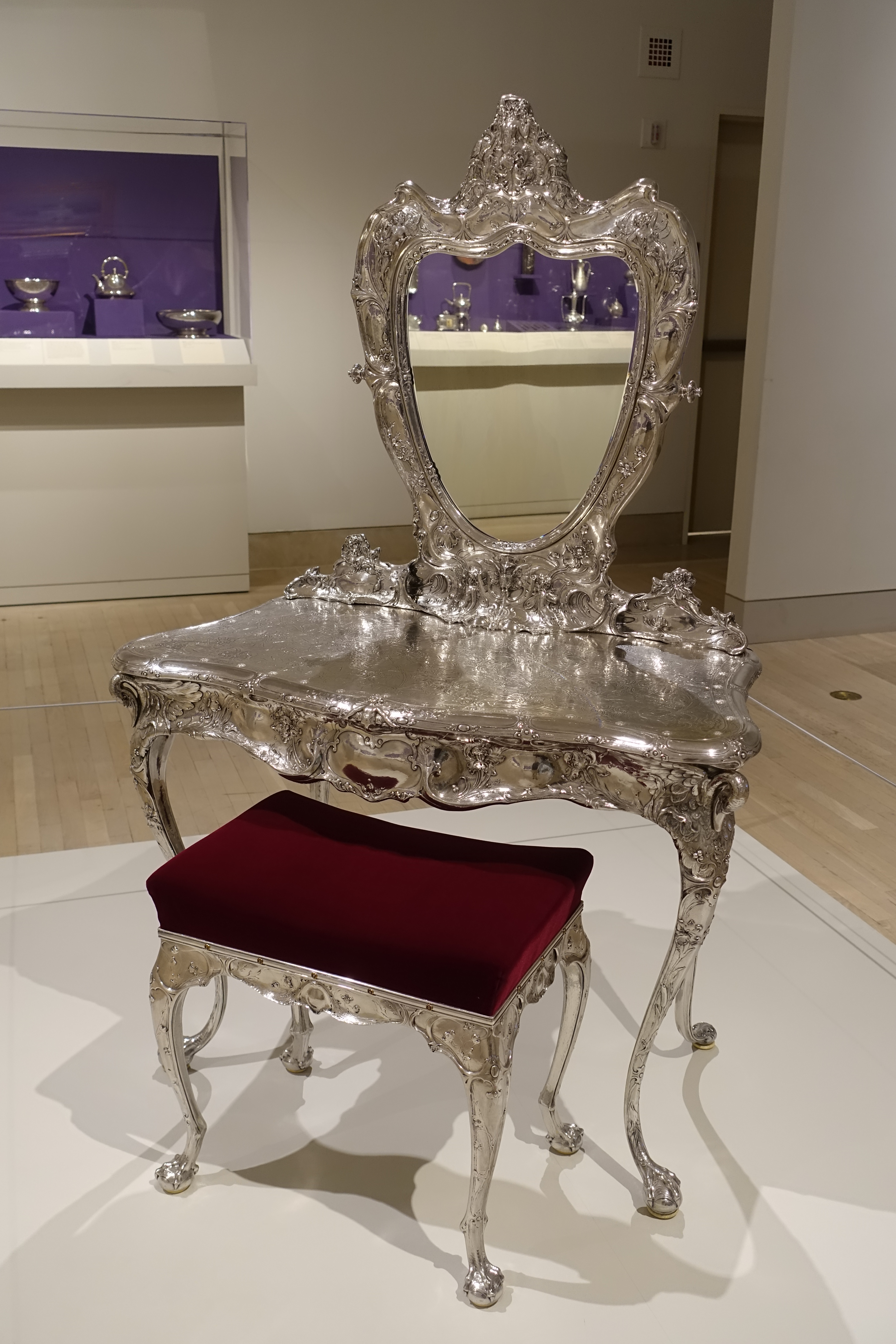
Martelé dressing table and stool, designed by William Christmas Codman

Martelé is a limited hand-wrought production line of silver.

== Production ==
The work, a departure from machine-made commercial cutlery and hollowware, was named Martelé, from the French verb marteler, "to hammer". The line was made from 1896 through the 1930s by the Gorham Manufacturing Company of Providence, Rhode Island under the direction of Gorham's chief executive, Edward Holbrook, and his chief designer, William Christmas Codman who was brought over from England in 1891.

According to Charles Carpenter (Gorham Silver) the metal used in Martelé was softer and purer than the sterling standard (950/1000 parts of silver, where sterling is 925/1000) in order to make the silver more malleable and easier to work by hand. Pristo (Martelé: Gorham's Nouveau Art Silver) indicates that Martelé was initially produced in sterling, but that the higher standard was likely used to meet the French requirement of .950 for the Paris exhibition (silver imported to France would need to be the .950 fineness). The purity was raised again during 1905 to .9584, likely to match the Britannia standard so the silver would be of the highest grade and could not be considered "inferior," especially in light of the awards won.

For early items, each object began as a flat piece of silver, raised with hammering to the desired shape by the maker before being passed on to the chaser (the craftsman that added decoration). The finished pieces will show the hammer marks because they were not planished or buffed, another reason they were called Martelé. Although uncommon, some of the later items, such as plates, may have started as spun but were then hammered (Pristo, page 42).

A Martelé dressing table took nine hundred hours to make and nearly fourteen hundred hours to chase, all in the context of a sixty-hour week. A coffeepot was raised in about seventy hours and chased in about seventy more, while a labor-intensive peppershaker could not be produced in less than about twenty-five hours, with another twenty hours for chasing.

Only 4,800 pieces were produced (other accounts put the number at 7,000 to 8,000) with Pristo indicating about 8200. Web sources indicate only 1500-1700 are still extant (Pristo indicating a suggestion not substantiated by auction records). When the price of silver went up in the 1980s, much Martelé silver was melted down (also not substantiated - the quality of Martelé was superior to items being melted, so few pieces were destroyed).

== Introduction ==
Carpenter indicates that although it was introduced at New York's Waldorf-Astoria Hotel in 1897, Gorham waited to officially announce the introduction of this new line at the Exposition Universelle (1900) in Paris, attended by 50,000,000 people. In fact, several hundred pieces were sold before the Paris exhibition, but Paris was the first major showing of Martelé to an international audience.

The Martelé line was enthusiastically received by both critics and an enamored public at this world exposition. Gorham’s chief executive officer, Edward Holbrook, was made a Chevalier of the Légion d’Honneur (the highest civilian honor given by the French government), and the chief designer for the Martelé line, William Christmas Codman, was awarded a gold medal. Gorham went on to win five gold medals for its silver at the Exposition Universelle. Gorham continued to display Martelé during the next expositions (Buffalo, St. Louis, Pan-Pacific, etc.) and continued to be awarded numerous prizes. Essentially, during the first 15 years of the 20th century, Martelé was judged to be some of the best silver in the world.

== Design ==
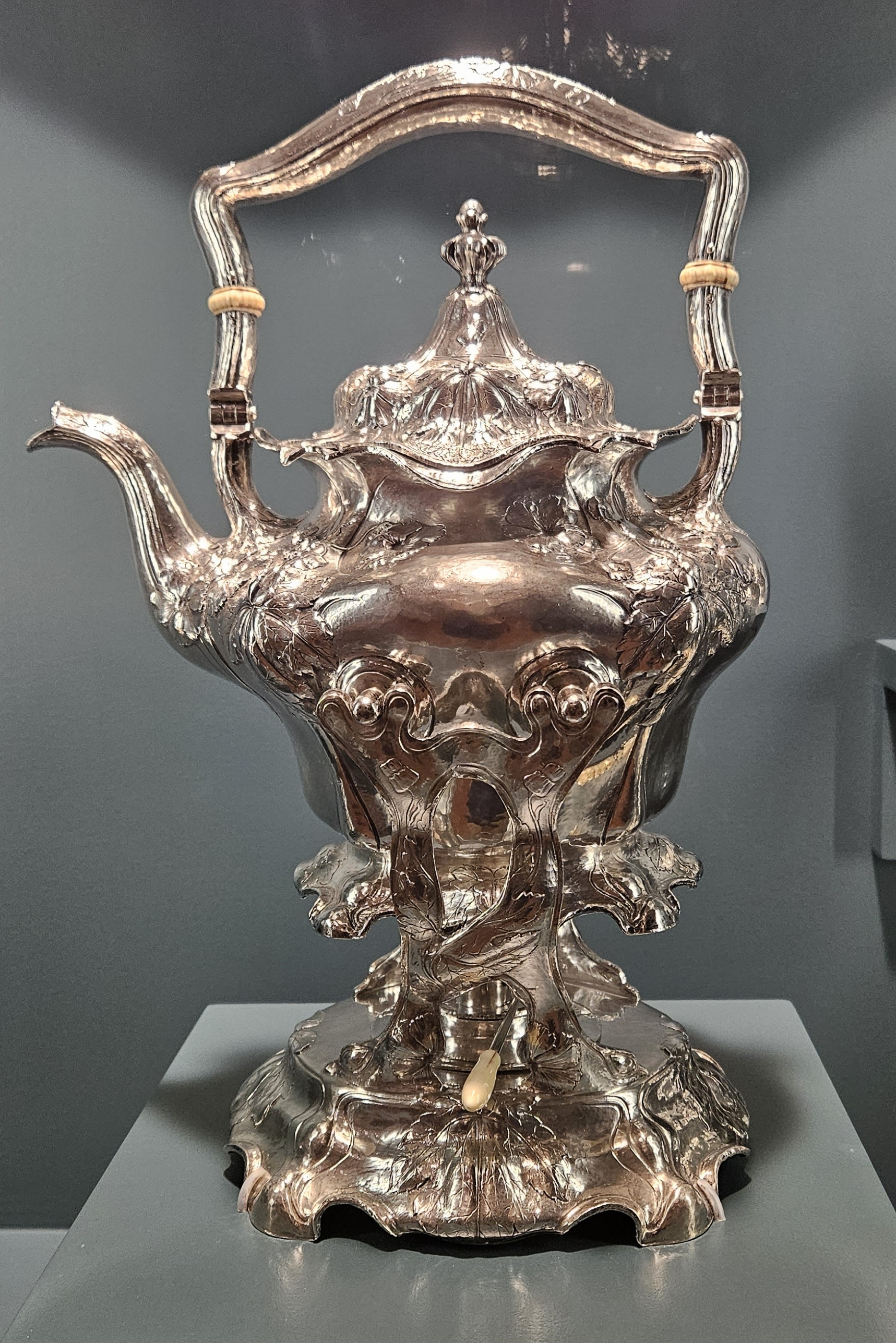
Martelé teapot at The Huntington Library, Art Museum, and Botanical Gardens

Martelé items include tea and coffee services, vases, candelabra, tankards, platters, and love cups. They are often made in Art Nouveau style, with classic and fantastic figures of female figures, floral and leaf decorations.

Each piece is different in that they were individually designed, and then hand made and chased which by nature produces uniqueness, where no two pieces can be the same

Martelé pieces were marked with the word "Martelé", over an eagle that topped the usual Gorham Hallmark at the time (a lion, anchor, and initial G). Underneath it was marked 950-1000 FINE. In order to keep track of each piece, all of the items were uniquely identified by a numerical or letter code, with the code indicating whether the particular item was a sample or a special order.

== Price ==
From the beginning, the Martelé line was expensive and exclusive, and received many awards. Prices remain high for collectors today; current prices range from $6,500 to $180,000 for individual pieces to as much as $1 million or more for elaborate designs, including museum-quality pieces like the ewer made for the 1900 Paris Exposition.

== Reed & Barton ==
Reed & Barton's answer to Gorham's famous Martelé silver line was to produce objects of a similar style and quality. They also used a higher silver standard similar to Martelé, 950/1000 silver. In comparison to Gorham's not so uncommon Martelé line, Reed & Barton's .950 silver line is very rare.
