= Liberty Arming the Patriot =

- U.S. National Register of Historic Places
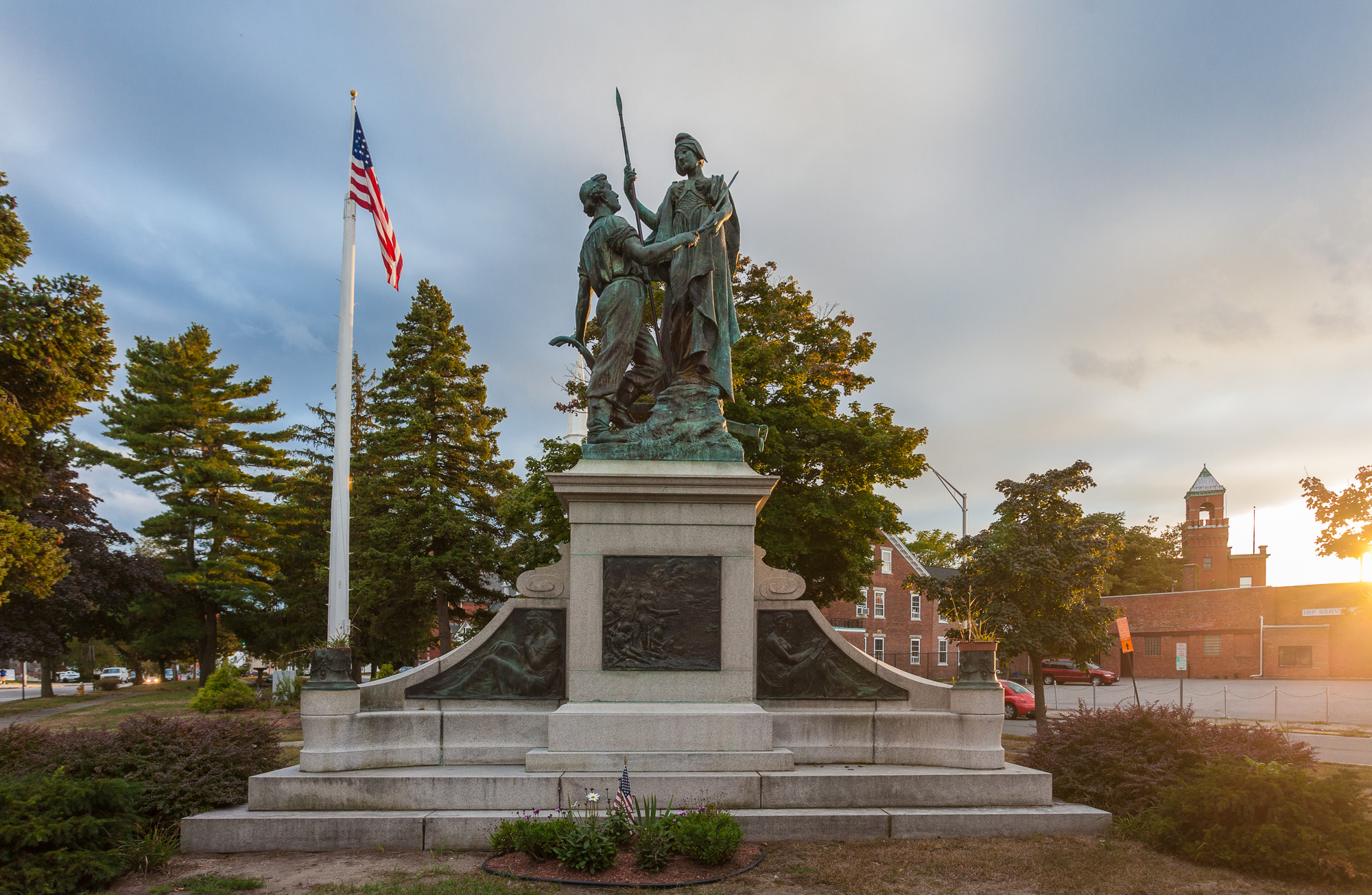

- Location within Rhode Island Location within the United States
- Location: Pawtucket, Rhode Island
- Coordinates: 41°52′37″N 71°23′14″W
- Area: less than one acre
- Built: 1897
- Architect: W. Granville Hastings
- MPS: Outdoor Sculpture of Rhode Island
- NRHP reference No.: 01000467
- Added to NRHP: October 19, 2001

Liberty Arming the Patriot, sometimes called Freedom Arming the Patriot, is a bronze sculpture at Park Place in Pawtucket, Rhode Island, commemorating the participation of the city's citizens in the American Civil War. It was designed by William Granville Hastings and cast by the Gorham Manufacturing Company in 1897. Unlike many Civil War memorials, Liberty Arming the Patriot is a dynamic composition, depicting a young farmer setting his plow aside, and reaching to take a sword from a classical female figure clad in breastplate and wielding a pike. The statue is 11 feet (3.4 m) in height, and is mounted on a granite base 10 feet (3.0 m) high and 22 feet (6.7 m) wide. The sculpture was listed on the National Register of Historic Places in 2001.

== History and design ==
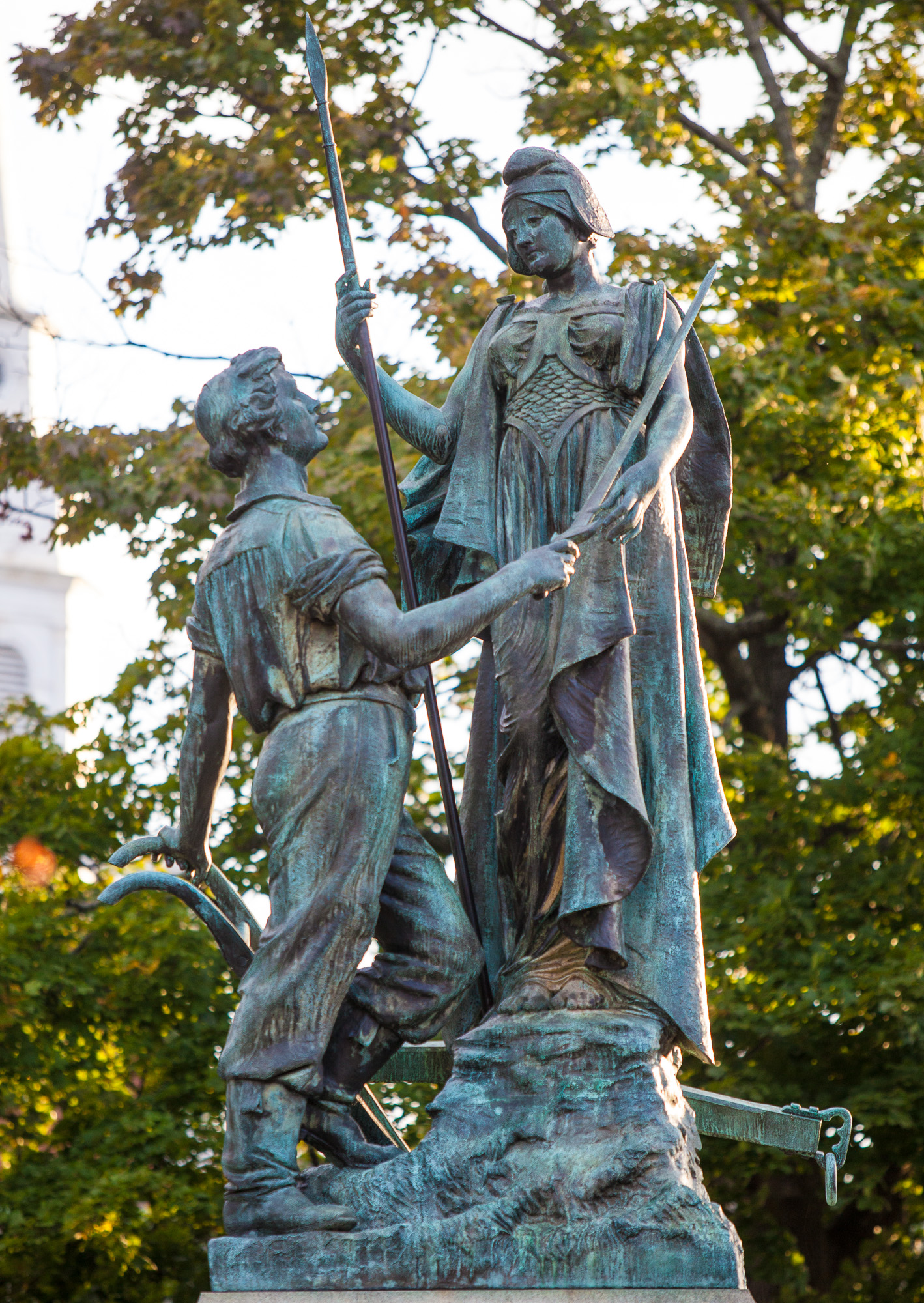
Close up of the statue

The sculpture was commissioned by the Ladies' Soldiers' Memorial Association of Pawtucket, Rhode Island to honor those who served in the American Civil War. The funding for the sculpture came as the result of an 11-year fundraising campaign that was provided for by donations and entertainment events. The cost of the monument was stated to be $13,000 by The New York Times, but report stated it to be $12,000. William Granville Hastings was chosen as the sculptor to execute the construction of the monument after winning a competition. The sculpture was cast by the Gorham Manufacturing Company.

The central feature of the monument depicts the theme of a young man called from civil life to serve his nation in a time of need and it transforms the theme into a contemporary allegory. It captures the decisive moment as farmer is caught mid-transition, with his left hand still on the plow handle, and taking the sword with his right hand from Liberty. The details of the farmer includes realistic work clothes, a yoked shirt with rolled sleeves and work trousers tucked into his boots. Liberty, identified by her Phrygian cap, stands just above the farmer in classical robes with a breastplate, sandals and cloak. Her face is impassive as she bestows the sword upon the farmer with her left hand while her right hand holds her pike.

Beneath the farmer and Liberty is a bronze plaque depicting a Union artillery battery under the command of General Ambrose Burnside capturing a bridge in the Battle of Antietam. Flanked on the sides are two smaller triangular plaques which depict the female figures of History and Eternity. The Scribe of History, alternatively known as Epic Poetry, is writing on a tablet and Eternity both contemplates and is identified by a fern. The monument was dedicated on May 31, 1897, in ceremony conducted by the Grand Army of the Republic and an oration given by the Governor of Rhode Island, Elisha Dyer, Jr. The statue is 11 feet (3.4 m) in height, and is mounted on a granite base 10 feet (3.0 m) high and 22 feet (6.7 m) wide.

According to the National Register of Historic Places, Liberty Arming the Patriot is historically significant as a "good representative of the character of early twentieth century figurative sculpture" and the quality of its design. It is also historically significant for its association with the Gorham Manufacturing Company, a prominent Rhode Island producer of high quality silverware and bronze statuary. Though it is commemorative in intention, the statue is important "because it documents the principal effort of Pawtucket to honor those who served in the Civil War." The sculpture was added to the National Register of Historic Places in 2001.

== Inscription ==
In Grateful Recognition Of The Valiant And Self-Sacrificing Service To Their Country Of All Persons Who Went From Pawtucket And Its Vicinity To Join The Forces Of The United States During The Civil War. And Especially To The Memory Of Those Who Suffered And Died In That Service. This Monument Is Erected By The Ladies Soldiers Memorial Association Of Pawtucket, Rhode Island And By Them Is Consecrated As An Everlasting Memorial · Anno Domini 1897

== See also ==
- National Register of Historic Places listings in Pawtucket, Rhode Island
