= William Hastings =

William or Bill Hastings may refer to:

- William Hastings, 1st Baron Hastings (ca. 1431–1483), English nobleman, close friend and Lord Chamberlain to King Edward IV, 1461-1483
- William C. Hastings (1921–2010), Chief Justice of the Nebraska Supreme Court
- William Soden Hastings (1798–1842), U.S. politician from Massachusetts (Whig)
- William Wirt Hastings (1866–1938), U.S. politician from Oklahoma (Democrat)
- William Granville Hastings (1868–1902), American sculptor born in England
- William Hastings-Bass, 17th Earl of Huntingdon (born 1948), English peer and racehorse trainer
- Bill Hastings (footballer) (1888–?), English football player
- Bill Hastings (judge) (born 1957), Canadian-born jurist who served as New Zealand's chief censor (1999–2010), then District Court Judge, Court Martial Judge, and Chief Justice of Kiribati.

== See also ==
- Hastings (name)
