= John Hastings =

John Hastings may refer to:

== English noblemen ==
- John Hastings, 1st Baron Hastings (1262–1313), peer and soldier
- John Hastings, 2nd Baron Hastings (1287–1325), peer and soldier, son of above
- John Hastings, 2nd Earl of Pembroke (1347–1375), peer and soldier, grandson of above
- John Hastings, 3rd Earl of Pembroke (1372–1389), nobleman, son of above
- John Hastings (died 1477), soldier and administrator

== Public officials ==
- John Hastings (MP) (c. 1525–c. 1585), MP for Reading, Leicester, Bridport and Poole
- John Hastings (Ohio politician) (1778–1854), Irish-born American Democratic lawyer, farmer and U.S. congressman
- John Simpson Hastings (1898–1977), United States federal judge from Indiana
- John A. Hastings (1900–1964), New York state senator
- John Hastings (Ontario politician) (born 1942), member of the Legislative Assembly of Ontario

== Sportspeople ==
- Jack Hastings or John Hastings (1858–1935), Northern Irish international footballer
- John Hastings (footballer) (1887–1972), English footballer
- John Hastings (cricketer) (born 1985), Australian all-rounder

== Others ==
- John Woodland Hastings (1927–2014), American professor of biology at Harvard University
- John Hastings (Passions)

== See also ==
- Hastings (name)
- John Hastyng, MP for Reading
