= Henry Hastings =

Henry Hastings may refer to:

- Henry de Hastings (died 1250), English soldier and noble
- Henry de Hastings (died 1268) (c. 1235–c. 1268), his son, English soldier and noble
- Henry Hastings, 3rd Earl of Huntingdon (c. 1535–1595), English nobleman, puritan and politician
- Henry Hastings (sportsman) (1551–1650), English landowner and eccentric country sportsman
- Henry Hastings, 5th Earl of Huntingdon (1586–1643), English nobleman and literary patron
- Henry Hastings, 1st Baron Loughborough (1610–1666/7), English Royalist army commander
- Henry Hastings (actor) (1879–1963), American actor who was in Tomorrow Is Forever
- Henry Hastings (MP) (died 1629), English politician

== See also ==
- Henry Hastings Sibley (1811–1891), first governor of Minnesota, US
