= George Hastings =

George Hastings may refer to:

- George Hastings, 1st Earl of Huntingdon (1488–1544), English nobleman
- George Hastings, 4th Earl of Huntingdon (1540–1604), English nobleman
- George Hastings, 8th Earl of Huntingdon (1677–1705)
- Sir George Hastings (died 1641), English MP for Leicester and Leicestershire
- Sir George Hastings (MP for Christchurch) (c. 1588–1651), English MP for Christchurch
- George Hastings (American politician) (1807–1866), US Congressman from New York's 28th District 1853–1855
- George Fowler Hastings (1814–1876), Royal Navy admiral
- George Hastings (MP for East Worcestershire) (1825–1917), British Member of Parliament for East Worcestershire 1880–1892
- George Hastings (footballer) (1877–1956), Australian rules footballer
- George Hastings (rugby union)
