= Edward Hastings =

Edward Hastings may refer to:

- Sir Edward Hastings (died 1437), English landowner and soldier
- Sir Edward Hastings (died 1603), MP for Leicestershire and Tregony
- Edward Hastings, 1st Baron Hastings of Loughborough (c.1521–1571)
- Edward Hastings, 2nd Baron Hastings (1466–1506)
- Edward Hastings (cricketer) (1849–1905), Australian cricketer
- Ned Hastings (Edward Hastings, born 1966), American video maker
- Edward Hastings, stage director of American Conservatory Theater
