= William Christmas Codman =

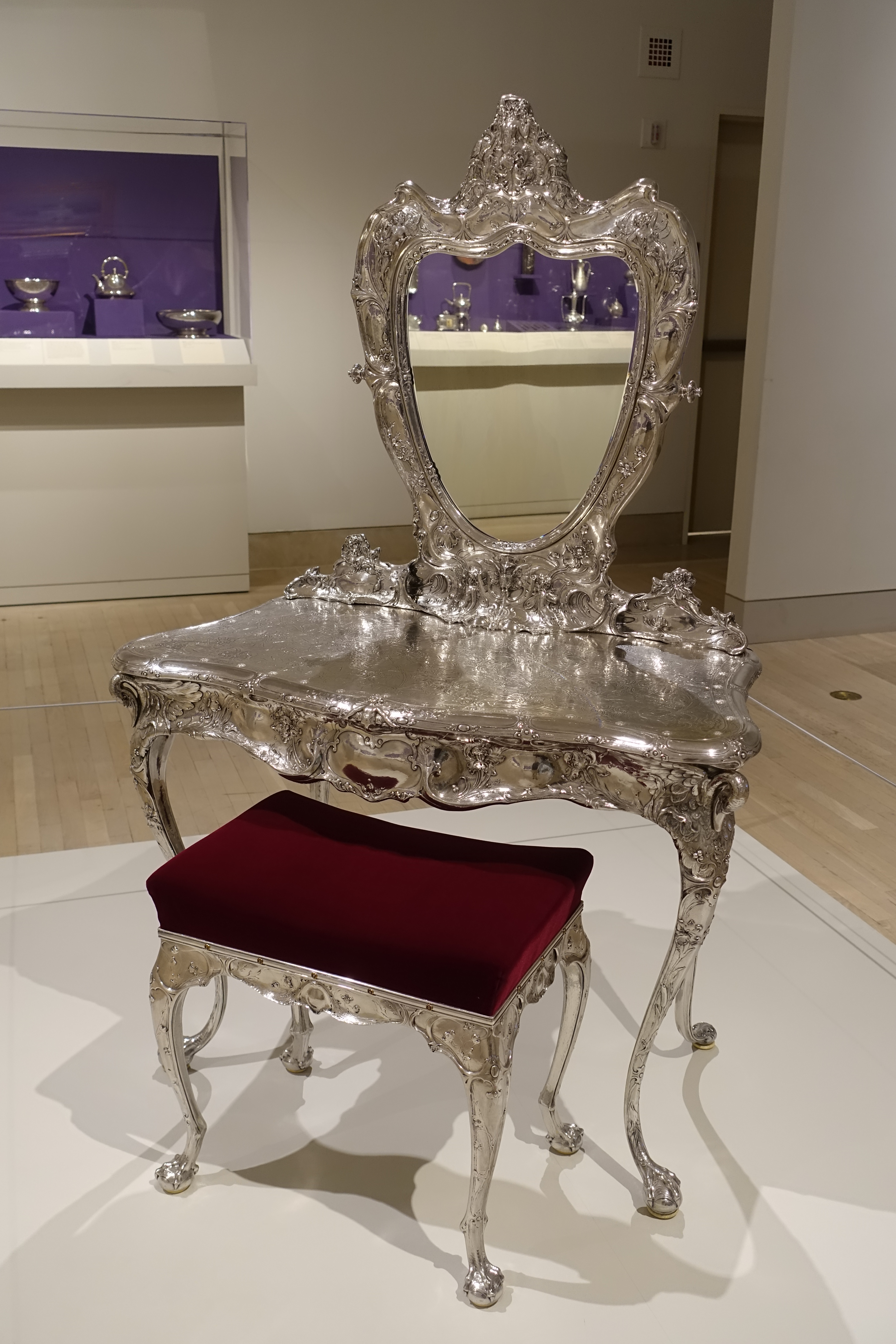
Martelé dressing table and stool, designed by William Christmas Codman

William Christmas Codman (December 25, 1839 – December 7, 1921) was a prominent silver and jewelry designer for Gorham Manufacturing Company of Providence, Rhode Island.

Codman was born in Norfolk, England, where he studied painting and drawing. He began his career at Ely Cathedral, working under Thomas Gambier Parry during the cathedral’s restoration from 1858 to 1862. He then worked as a designer for abbeys and cathedrals, probably for Sir Gilbert Scott, in the Gothic Revival style. His church designs included communion plate for the See of Liverpool and the Memorial Chapel in Delhi, India; candelabra for St. Paul's in London; and lighting fixtures for the Notre-Dame Cathedral, Luxembourg. He subsequently worked for the Birmingham firm of Elkington & Co., and the London silversmithing company Cox and Son, then from 1884 to 1887 supervised the construction of furniture designed by the English painter Sir Lawrence Alma-Tadema for Messrs. Johnstone, Norman & Company of London. Codman married Emma Rolle in 1865; they had six children.

When in 1891 Gorham Manufacturing Company began their ecclesiastical design department, they hired Codman as their chief designer. He spent two years designing objects for Gorham's display at the 1893 World's Columbian Exposition in Chicago, and afterwards designed most objects that Gorham displayed in subsequent world's fairs. He was particularly active in designing Gorham silverware, and is credited with fifty-five flatware patterns. His most famous Gorham work, however, was Martelé, a line of Art Nouveau style furniture unveiled in 1900 at the Exposition Universelle in Paris.

In 1914, at age seventy-five, Codman retired from Gorham and returned to England, where he died in 1921 at his home in Woking, Surrey.
