= Richard Hastings (disambiguation) =

Richard Hastings (born 1977) is a Canadian soccer player.

Richard Hastings may also refer to:

- Richard Hastings, Baron Welles (died 1503)
- Sir Richard Hastings, 1st Baronet (died 1668), of the Hastings baronets
- Doc Hastings (Richard Norman Hastings, born 1941), American politician

== See also ==
- Hastings (name)
