= William Granville Hastings =

American sculptor

- Born: 1868; Kennington, Surrey, England
- Died: June 13, 1902 (aged 33–34); Mount Vernon, New York, US
- Education: Lambeth School of Art
- Occupation: sculptor
- Notable work: see list

William Granville Hastings (1868 – June 13, 1902) was an American sculptor born in England.

Hastings was born in Kennington, Surrey, England, attended the Lambeth School of Art where he won awards for his vases and worked for Royal Doulton at their Lambeth works, and in 1889 moved to Paris to apprentice with Jules Dalou. In 1890 he married Florence Edith Keyzar in Lambeth, and in 1892 immigrated to the United States to work as a designer and sculptor for the Gorham Manufacturing Company in Providence, Rhode Island, where his first task was to design works for the 1893 World's Columbian Exposition. He received the commission for Liberty Arming the Patriot in 1896. Hastings died in Mount Vernon, New York, of stomach cancer.

== Notable works ==
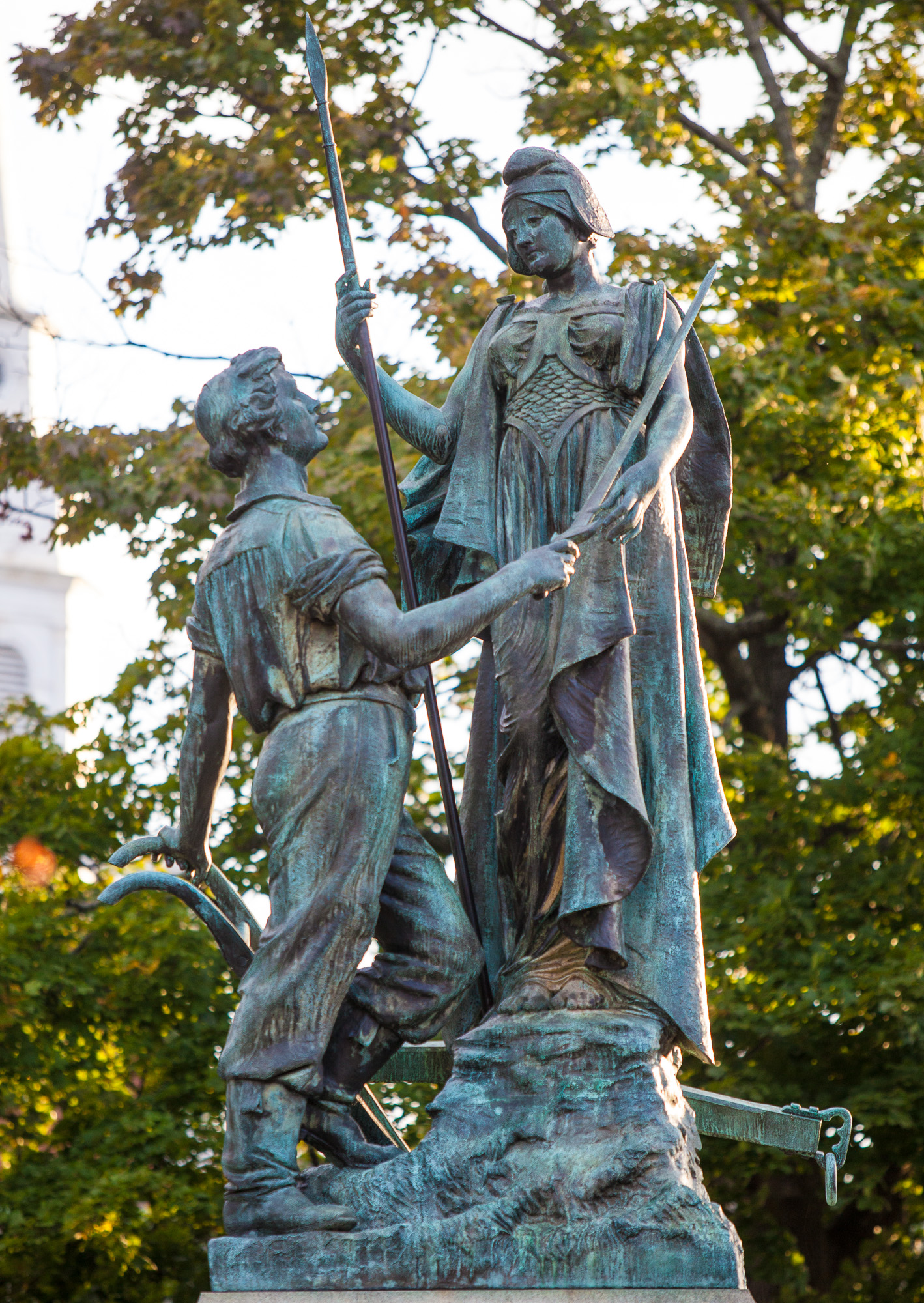
Liberty Arming the Patriot

His best-known works include:

- Liberty Arming the Patriot, Pawtucket, Rhode Island
- Soldiers and Sailors' Monument, Pawtucket, Rhode Island
- Soldiers and Sailors' Monument, Orange, New Jersey
- Abraham Lincoln Monument, Cincinnati, Ohio
- 15th Pennsylvania Cavalry Regiment Monument, Chickamauga and Chattanooga National Military Park
