= Michael Hastings =

Michael or Mike Hastings may refer to:

- Michael Hastings (playwright) (1938–2011), British playwright, screenwriter, novelist, and poet
- Michael Abney-Hastings, 14th Earl of Loudoun (1942–2012), English-born Australian rice farmer, Scottish aristocrat, and pretender to the ancient Crown of England
- Michael Hastings, Baron Hastings of Scarisbrick (born 1958), British peer and television executive
- Mike Hastings (ice hockey) (born 1966), American coach
- Michael Hastings (journalist) (1980–2013), American journalist, author, contributing editor to Rolling Stone and reporter for BuzzFeed
- Michael Hastings (politician) (born 1980), member of Illinois State Senate
- Michael Harvey Hastings, British neuroscientist

== See also ==
- Hastings (name)
