= Scott Hastings =

Scott Hastings may refer to:

- Scott Hastings (baseball) (1847–1907), American baseball player
- Scott Hastings (basketball) (born 1960), American basketball player
- Scott Hastings (rugby union) (1964–2026), Scottish rugby player
- Scott Hastings, fictional dancer in 1992 Australian romantic comedy film Strictly Ballroom

== See also ==
- Hastings (name)
