= Charles Hastings =

Charles Hastings may refer to:

- Sir Charles Hastings, 1st Baronet (1752–1823), British Army officer
- Sir Charles Abney-Hastings, 2nd Baronet (1792–1858), High Sheriff of Derbyshire and MP for Leicester, 1826–1831
- Sir Charles Hastings (English physician) (1794–1866), medical surgeon and a founder of the British Medical Association
- Charles Hastings (Canadian physician) (1858–1931), obstetrician and public health pioneer
- Charlie Hastings (1870–1934), baseball pitcher
- Charles S. Hastings (1848–1932), American physicist

== See also ==
- Sir Charles Hastings Doyle (1804–1883), British military officer and Lieutenant Governor in Canada
- Hastings (name)
