= William Dean Whiting =

American silversmith and jeweler (1815–1891)

- Born: December 23, 1815; Attleboro, Massachusetts, U.S.
- Died: November 26, 1891 (aged 75); North Attleborough, Massachusetts, U.S.
- Occupations: Silversmith, jeweler
- Spouse: Rebecca Damon
- Children: 4

William Dean Whiting (December 23, 1815 - November 26, 1891) was an American silversmith and jeweler. He was the founder of the Whiting Manufacturing Company, and "one of the most prominent jewelry manufacturers" in the United States according to the Boston Globe.

== Life ==
Whiting was born on December 23, 1815, in Attleboro, Massachusetts. He was trained by Draper and Tifft, a jewelry company co-founded by his uncle John Tifft.

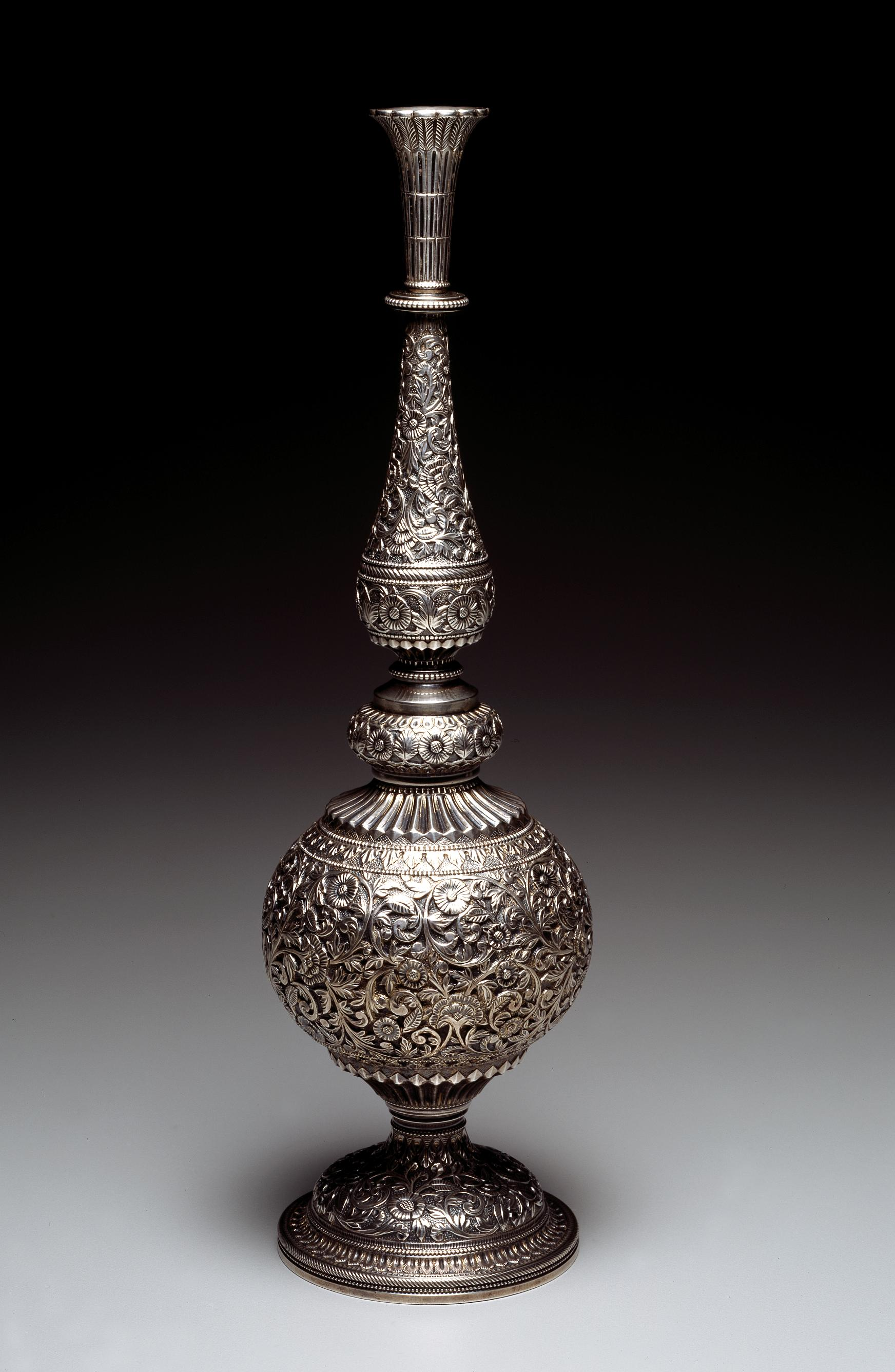
Silver Vase, Whiting Manufacturing Co., 1880, Dallas Museum of Art

Whiting died on November 26, 1891, in North Attleborough, Massachusetts, at 76. His son Frank M. Whiting was also a silversmith. The Whiting Manufacturing Company merged with the Gorham Manufacturing Company in 1924.

== Whiting Manufacturing Co. ==
In 1840, Whiting co-founded his own jewelry company Tifft and Whiting with his cousin Albert Crandall Tifft. After Tifft retirement in 1853, Whitening renamed the company as Whiting & Gooding (& Co). Next thirteen years, the company was rebaptized as Whiting Fessenden & Cowan (1858), Tifft Whiting & Co (1859), Whiting Cowan & Bowen (1864) until its forming as Whiting Manufacturing Co. in 1866.

The factory of Whiting Manufacturing Co. was located in North Attleborough, Massachusetts, but it was destroyed by a fire in 1875. After that, the company's manufacturing center was transferred to New York. The ruins of the factory were acquired by F. Jones.

Even if Whiting had a small production output, his company was recognized as an exceptional hand-made producer. Charles Osborne was the most famous designer in the company, considered one of the most influential designers of the American aesthetic movement. The first Goelet Cup offered in sailing was produced by Whiting in 1882.

By 1891, William Dean Whiting was described as "one of the most prominent jewelry manufacturers" in the United States by the Boston Globe.

=== Silverware ===
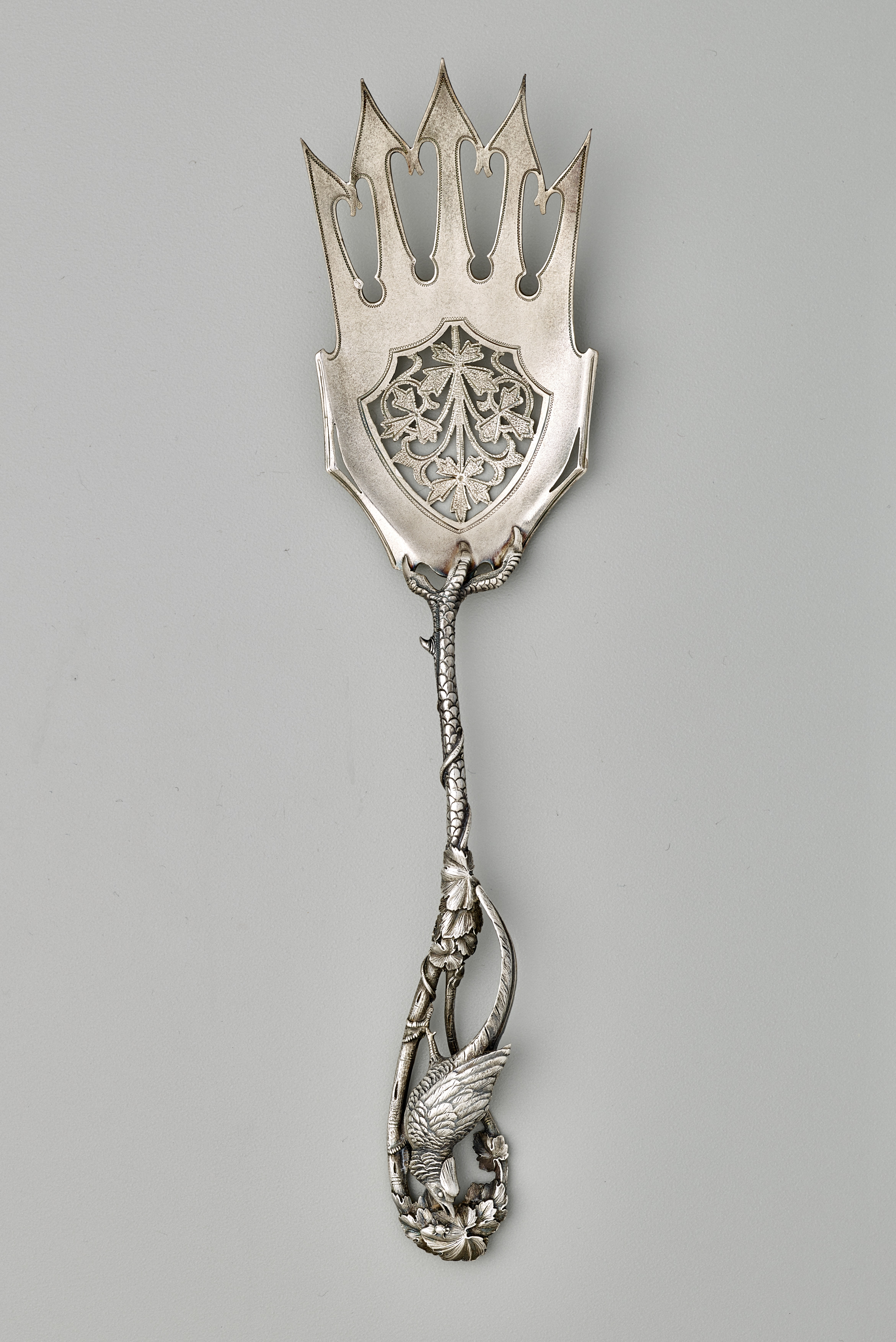
Serving fork, Whiting Manufacturing Co., 1875-1880, Dallas Museum of Art

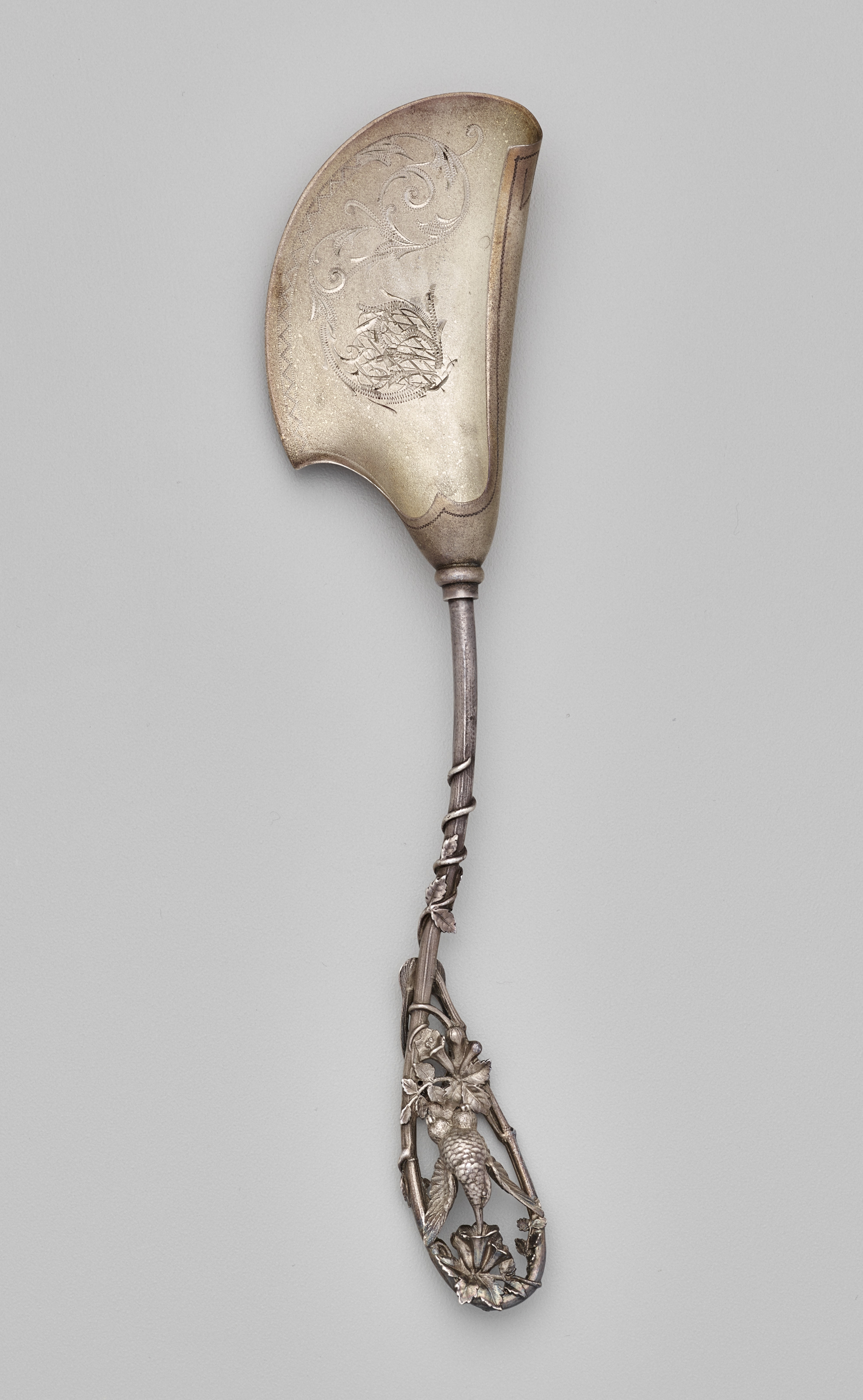
Hummingbird scoop, Whiting Manufacturing Co., 1875-1880, Dallas Museum of Art

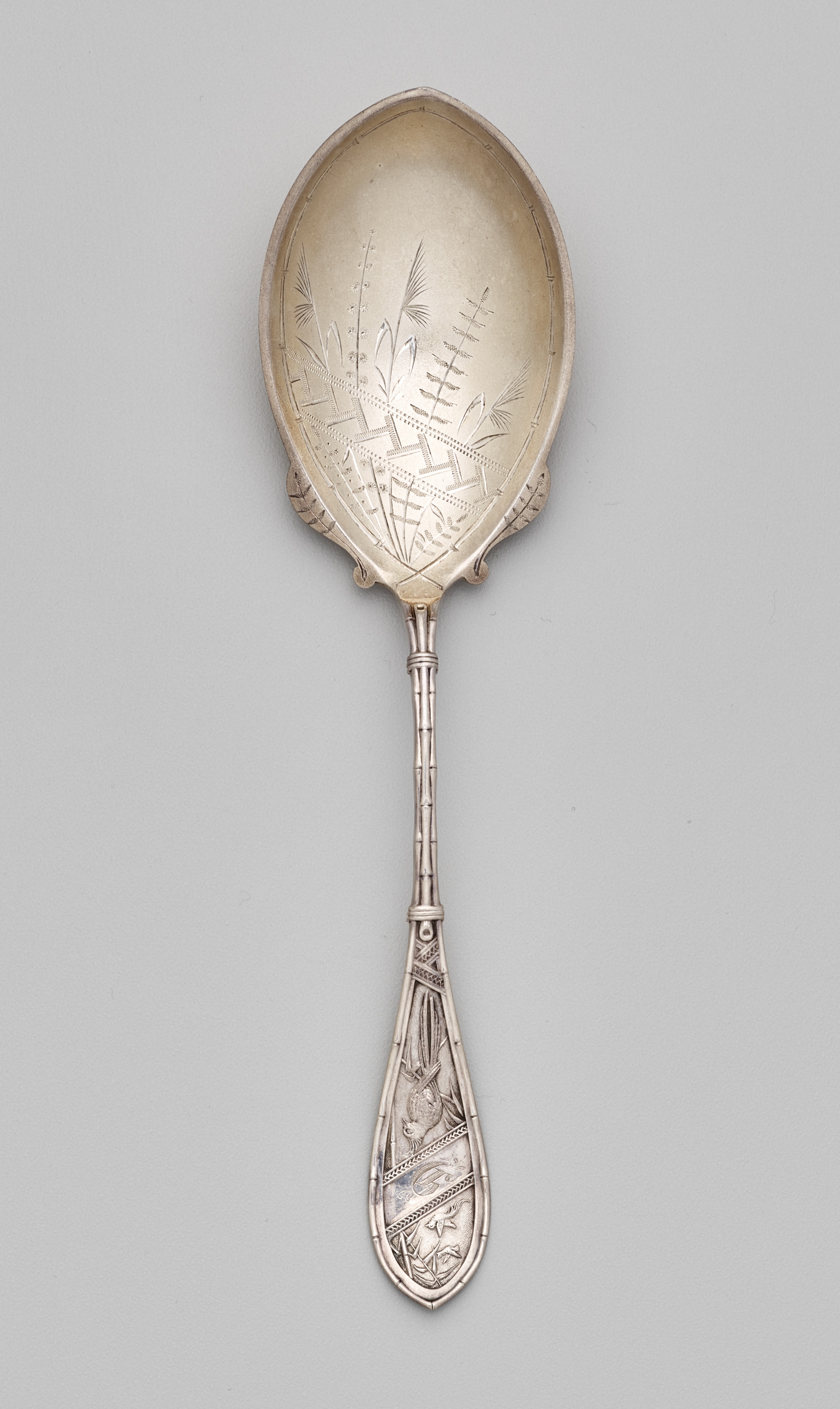
Japanese-style serving spoon, Whiting Manufacturing Co., c. 1874, Dallas Museum of Art

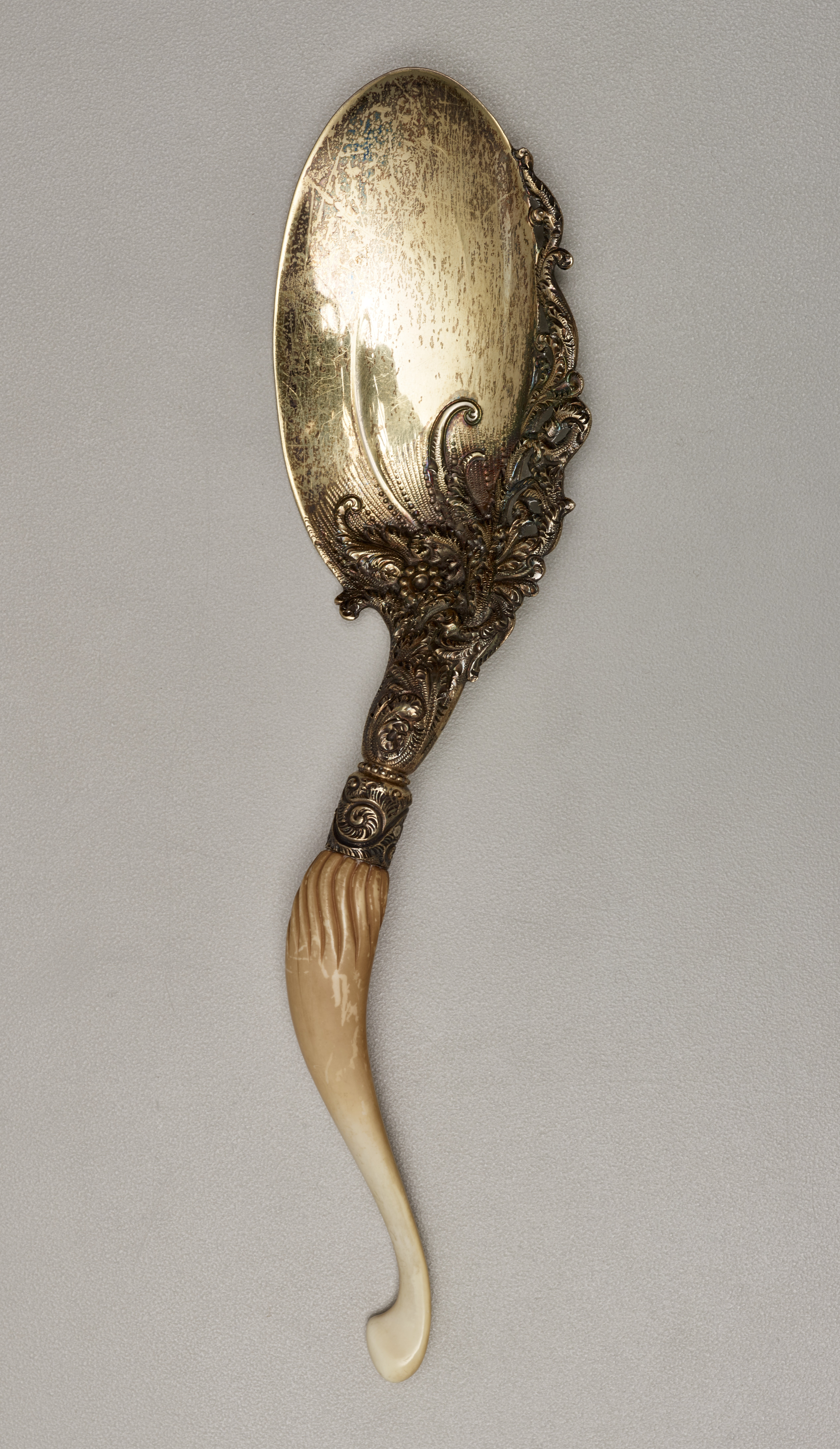
Ivory silver spoon, Whiting Manufacturing Co., 1890, Dallas Museum of Art

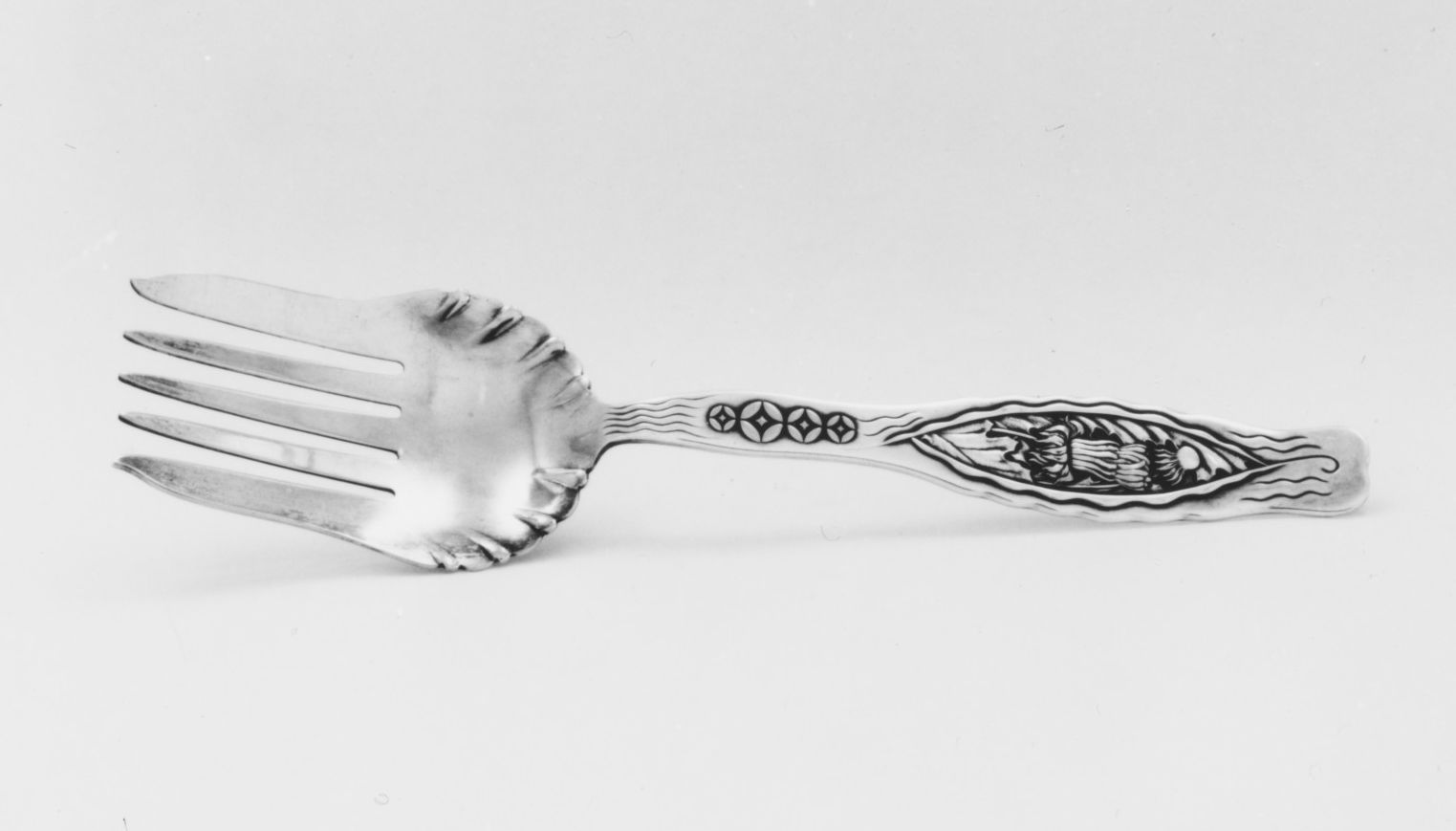
Serving fork, Whiting Manufacturing Co., ca.1900, Metropolitan Museum of Art

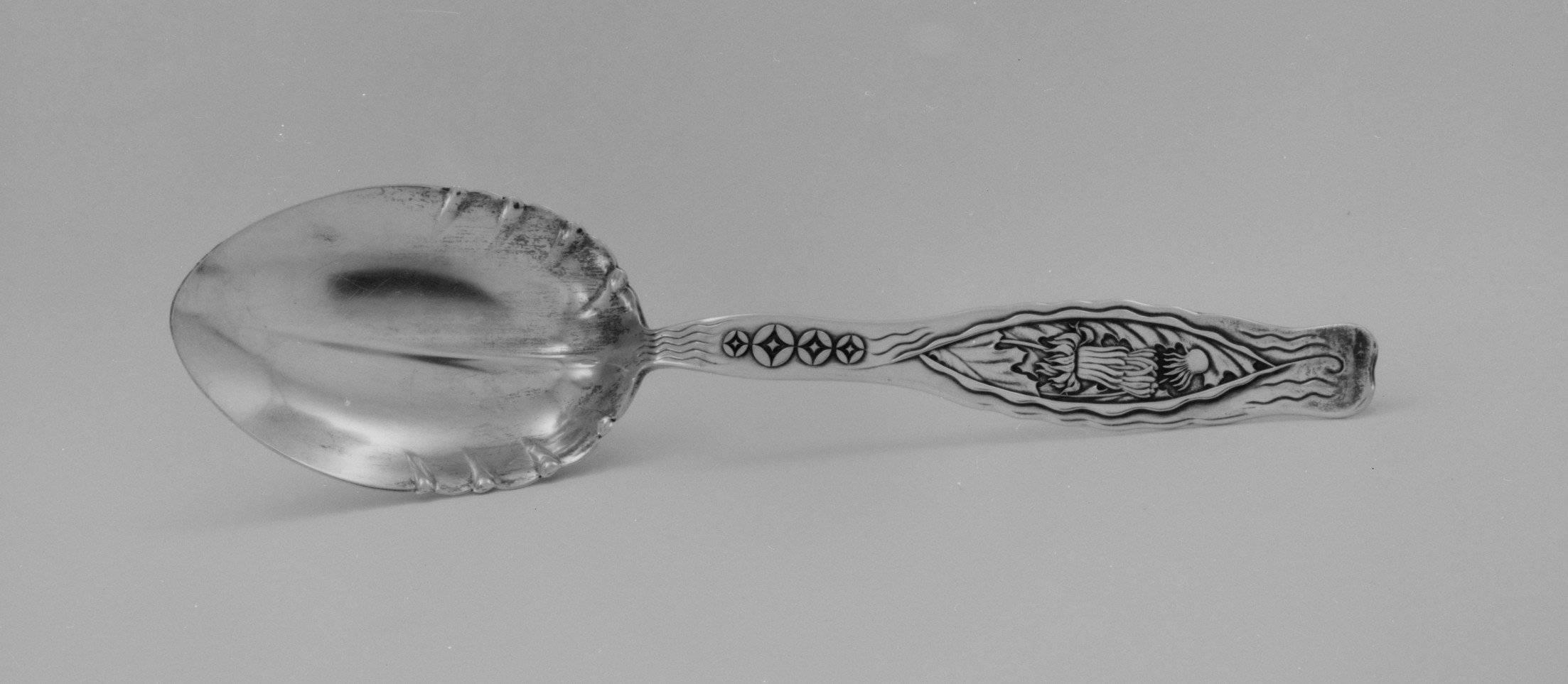
Serving spoon, Whiting Manufacturing Co., c. 1900, Metropolitan Museum of Art

=== Tea Sets ===
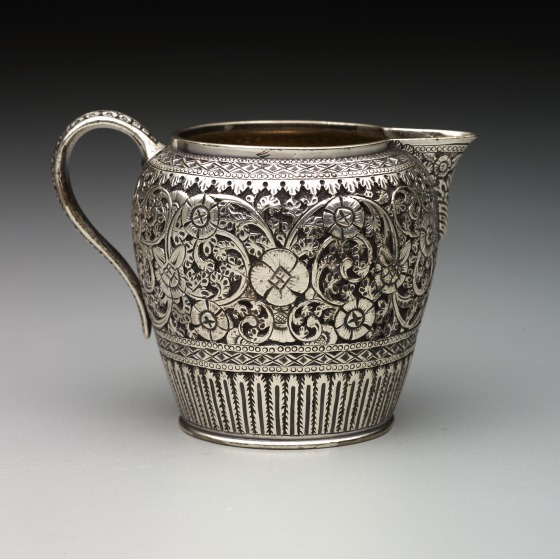
Creamer, Whiting Manufacturing Co., 1890, Dallas Museum of Art

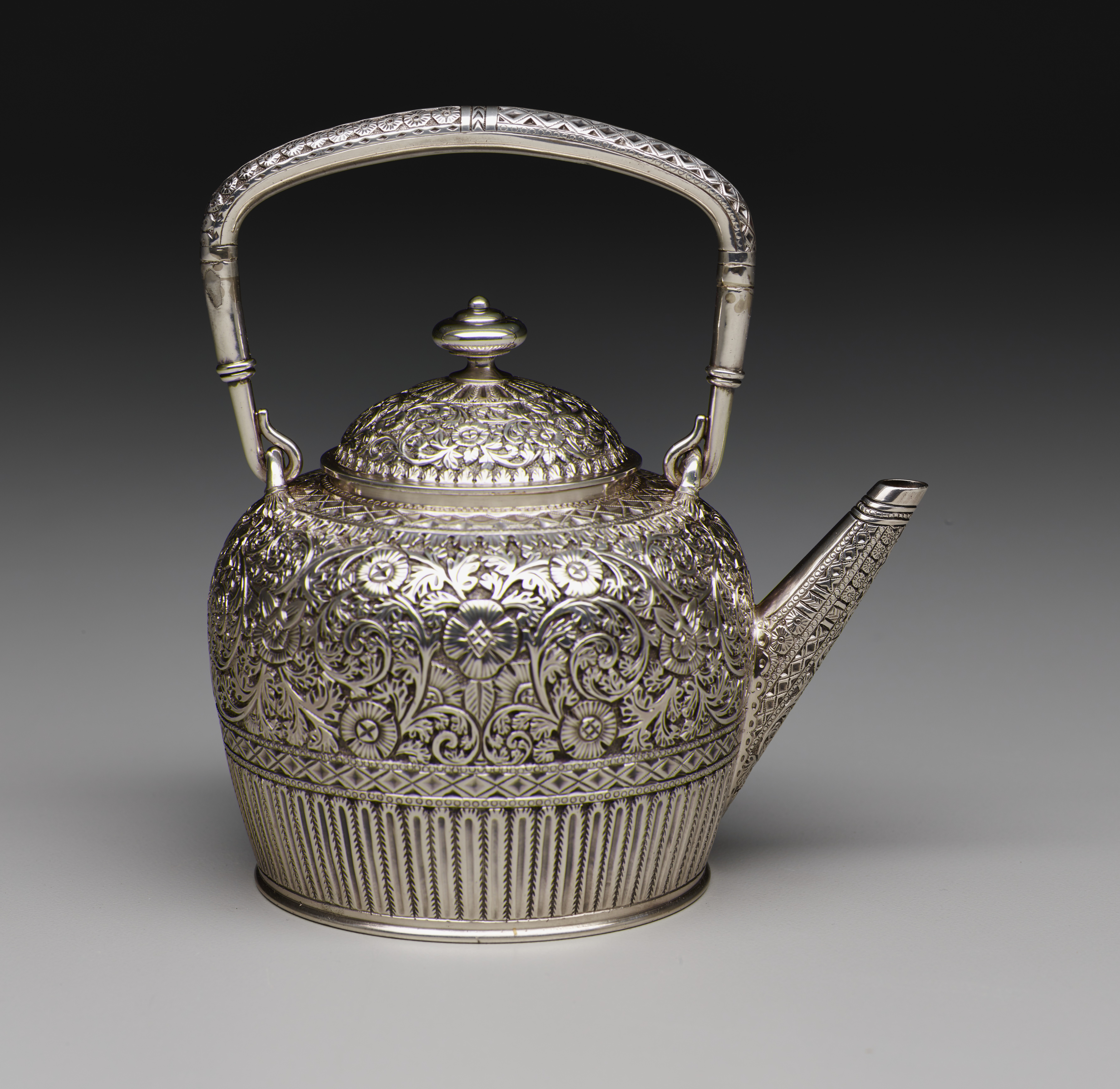
Teapot, Whiting Manufacturing Co., 1890, Dallas Museum of Art

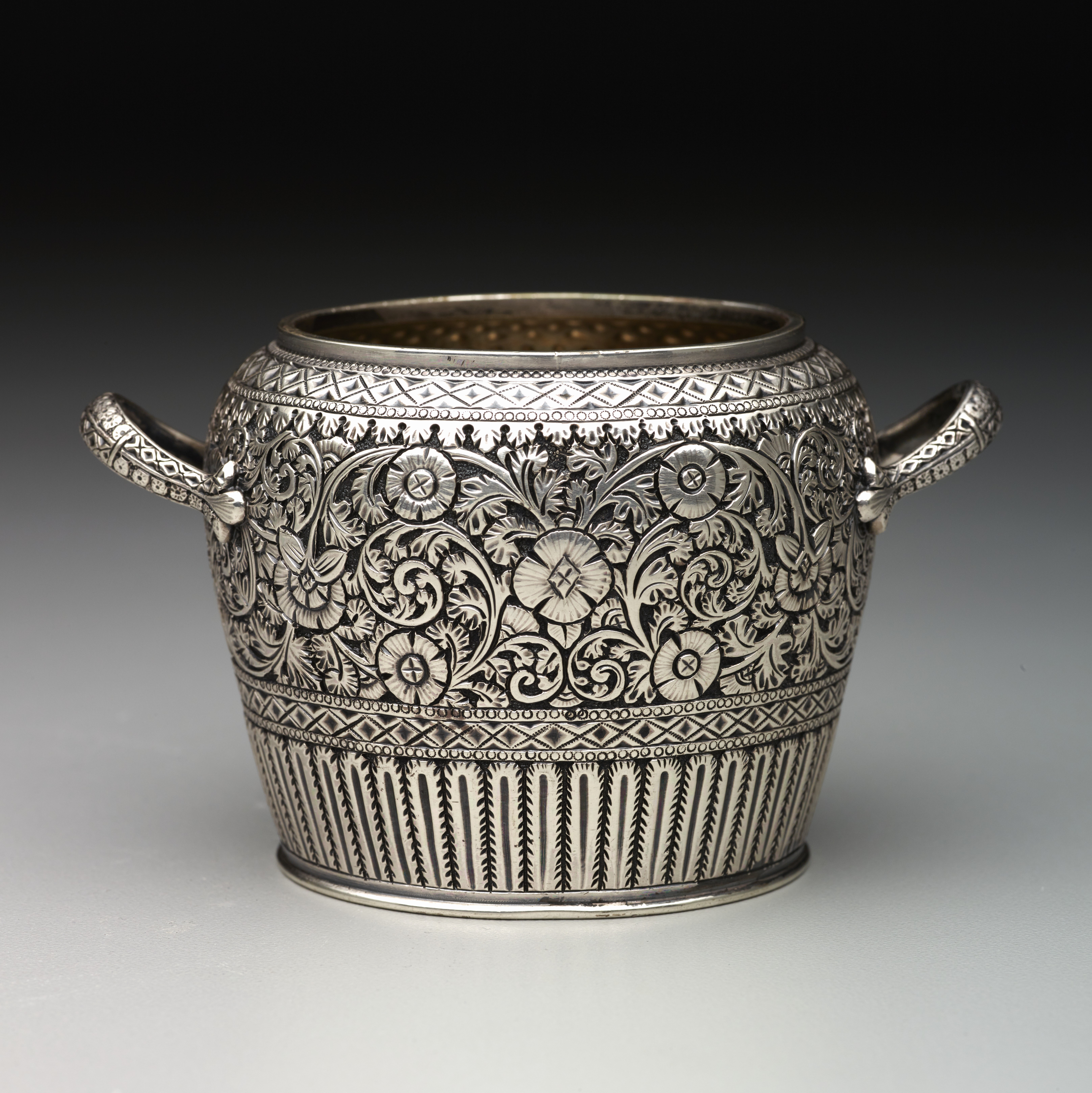
Sugar Bowl, Whiting Manufacturing Co., 1890, Dallas Museum of Art

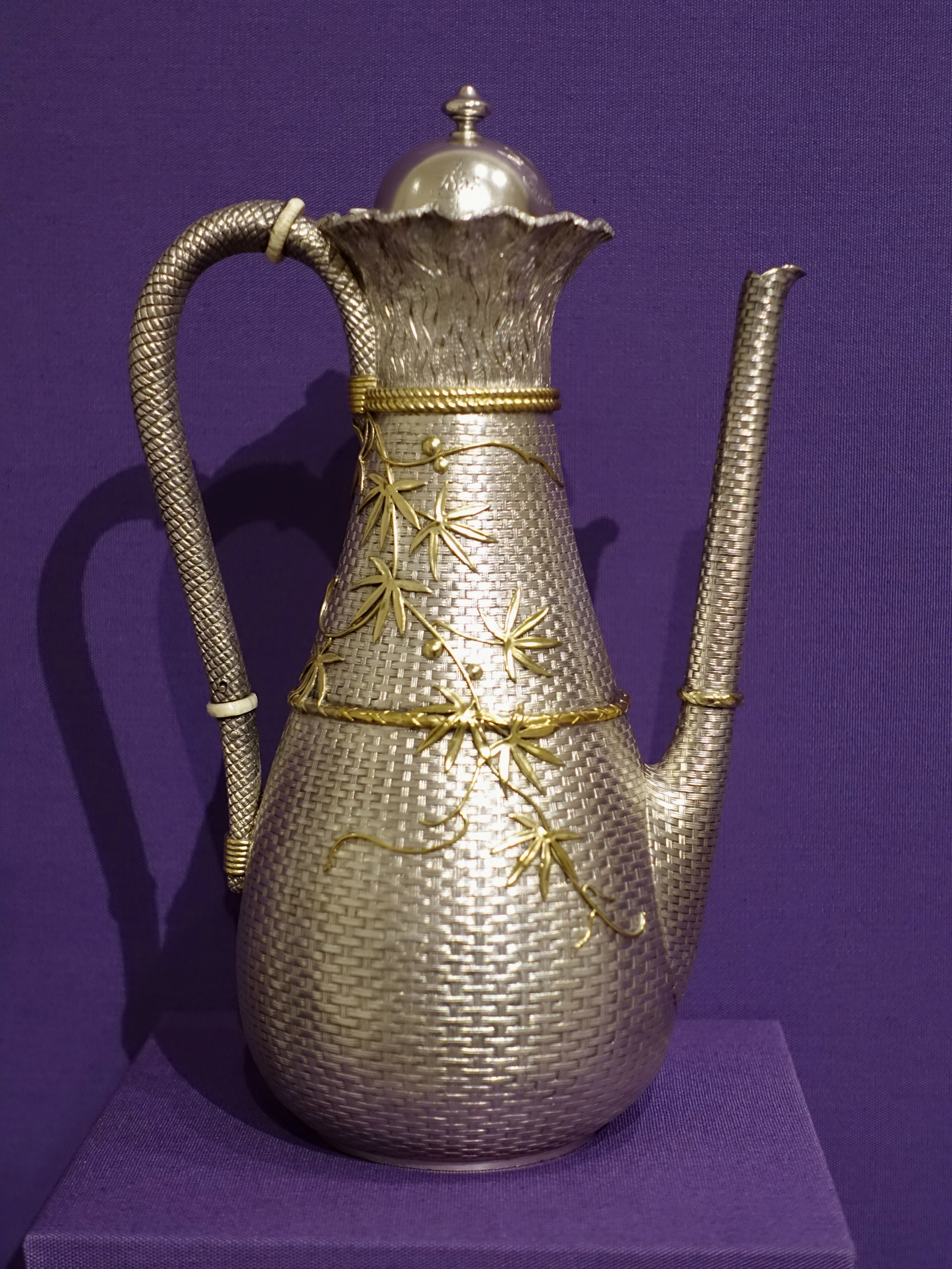
Coffeepot, Whiting Manufacturing Co., c. 1883, Dallas Museum of Art
