= Meredith G. Hastings =

US atmospheric chemist and academic

Meredith Hastings
- Education: B.Sc. University of Miami, Coral Gables, Ph.D. Princeton University
- Awards: 2014, Atmospheric Sciences Ascent Award, American Geophysical Union; 2014, CAREER Award, National Science Foundation
- Scientific career
- Fields: Atmospheric Chemistry
- Workplaces: Brown University; National Oceanic and Atmospheric Administration Geophysical Fluid Dynamics Laboratory; Joint Institute for the Study of the Atmosphere and Ocean Department of Atmospheric Sciences
- Thesis: Studies of Reactive Nitrogen in the Atmosphere Using Global Modeling and Stable Isotope Measurements. (2004)
- Website: https://vivo.brown.edu/display/mhasting

Meredith G. Hastings is an American atmospheric chemist and a professor of earth, environmental, and planetary sciences at Brown University. Her research focuses on the reactive nitrogen cycle and how atmospheric chemistry affects climate. She is also the founder and president of the Earth Science Women's Network (ESWN).

== Early life and education ==
Hastings graduated magna cum laude with a Bachelor of Science in marine science and chemistry from the University of Miami, Coral Gables in 1998. After her undergraduate she did a research internship at the National Oceanic and Atmospheric Administration’s Geophysical Fluid Dynamics Laboratory in Princeton, NJ. She credits this position to her interest in atmospheric chemistry. By 2004 Hastings had completed her Ph.D. in the Princeton University department of Geosciences. Her thesis studied reactive nitrogen using measurements of stable isotopes and was titled "Studies of Reactive Nitrogen in the Atmosphere Using Global Modeling and Stable Isotope Measurements".

== Career and research ==
Following her Ph.D. work at Princeton, Hastings became a postdoctoral fellow at the University of Washington in the Joint Institute for the Study of the Atmosphere and Ocean Department of Atmospheric Sciences (JISAO). After completing her postdoctoral work in 2008, Hastings joined the faculty at Brown University as an assistant professor in the Department of Geological Sciences and Environmental Change Initiative. Hastings became an associate professor of earth, environmental and planetary sciences at Brown University in 2015 and was promoted to professor in 2020. She was the deputy director of the Institute at Brown for Environment and Society between 2020 and 2023.

Hastings’ work focuses around the reactive nitrogen cycle and using nitrate deposition to see how human activity impacts atmospheric composition. This includes data from a variety of sources such as seawater nitrate levels, freshwater nitrate levels, and ice core nitrate levels. Using this data her studies have come to conclusions about how human activities and environmental responses interact to explain how the climate changes.

In 2014 Hastings launched the Earth Science Women's Network (ESWN) as a non-profit, an organization she co-founded in 2002. She is currently president of the non-profit, which seeks to promote women in the earth sciences. The Earth Science Women's Network is a member-driven organization which has had several prominent creations since its inception. In 2014 the ESWN created the Promoting Geoscience, Research, Education and Success (PROGRESS) initiative which focused on determining the role same-gender mentoring on the retention of women in the geosciences. The initiative was funded by a National Science Foundation (NSF) grant. In 2017, Hastings and the ESWN partnered with the Association for Women Geoscientists and the American Geophysical Union to launch the ADVANCEGeo Partnership. The partnership seeks to address the issue of sexual harassment in the earth, space and environmental sciences and was also funded by a NSF grant.

Hastings was also the recipient of the Atmospheric Sciences Ascent Award, which the American Geophysical Union awarded her in 2014. The award is designed to recognize research by mid-career scientists in the fields of atmospheric and climate sciences. She was recognized for her work modeling aerosol properties and their impacts on the atmosphere. Hastings was also recognized with a CAREER award from the National Science Foundation in 2014 supporting her work studying where the nitrous oxide in the atmosphere is being emitted from. The project is entitled Quantifying the Isotopic Signature of Nitrogen Oxides Emissions Sources.

=== Publications ===
Hastings' work has been published in several scientific journals, including Science, The Journal of Geophysical Research, Environmental Science & Technology, and Analytical Chemistry. Her most cited publications are listed below:

- KL Casciotti, DM Sigman, MG Hastings, JK Böhlke, A Hilker (2002) Measurement of the oxygen isotopic composition of nitrate in seawater and freshwater using the denitrifier method. Analytical Chemistry, 74 (19), 4905-4912
- MG Hastings, JC Jarvis, EJ Steig (2009) Anthropogenic impacts on nitrogen isotopes of ice-core nitrate. Science, 324 (5932), 1288-1288
- B Alexander, MG Hastings, DJ Allman, J Dachs, JA Thornton, SA Kunasek (2009) Quantifying atmospheric nitrate formation pathways based on a global model of the oxygen isotopic composition (Δ 17 O) of atmospheric nitrate. Atmospheric Chemistry and Physics, 9 (14), 5043-5056

=== Awards and recognition ===
- 2014, Atmospheric Sciences Ascent Award, American Geophysical Union
- 2014, CAREER Award, National Science Foundation
