= Chris Hastings =

Notable people named Chris Hastings include:

- Chris Hastings (chef) (fl. 1980s–2020s), American chef and restaurant owner
- Chris Hastings (ski jumper) (born 1964), American ski jumper
- Chris Hastings (media executive) (fl. 1990s–2020s), American media executive and educator
- Christopher Hastings (born c. 1983), American comics writer and artist
