= Francis Hastings =

Francis Hastings may refer to:

- Francis Hastings (died 1595) (1560–1595), MP for Leicestershire
- Francis Hastings, 2nd Earl of Huntingdon (1514–1561), son of Henry VIII's mistress, Anne Stafford
- Sir Francis Hastings (died 1610) (c. 1545–1610), his son, Member of Parliament for Leicestershire and Somerset
- Francis Hastings Doyle (1810–1888), British poet
- Francis Hastings of Madras (died 1721), British president of Madras
- Francis Hastings, 10th Earl of Huntingdon (1729–1789), British peer
- Francis Hastings, 16th Earl of Huntingdon (1901–1990), British artist, academic and Labour politician
- Francis Hastings, Lord Hastings (1560–1595), son of the 4th Earl of Huntingdon

== See also ==
- Francis Rawdon-Hastings, 1st Marquess of Hastings (1754–1826), Anglo-Irish British politician and military officer
- Frank Hastings, fictional detective
