= John Hastings (footballer) =

English footballer

Personal information
- Full name: John George Hastings
- Date of birth: 31 March 1887
- Place of birth: Thornaby-on-Tees, England
- Date of death: 1972 (aged 84–85)
- Height: 5 ft 8 in (1.73 m)
- Position: Full-back

Senior career*
Years	Team	Apps	(Gls)
- Darlington St Augustine's
1908–1913	Sunderland	1	(0)
- * Club domestic league appearances and goals

John George Hastings (31 March 1887 – 1972) was an English professional footballer who played from 1908 to 1913 as a full-back in the Football League for Sunderland.
