= Thomas Hastings (priest) =

Irish Anglican priest

Thomas Hastings (1733-1794) was a clergyman in the Church of Ireland during the 18th century.

Hastings was educated at Trinity College, Dublin. He was Precentor of St Patrick's Cathedral, Dublin from 1781 to 1785; and Archdeacon of Dublin from 1785 until his death.
