= Gorham Manufacturing Company =

American manufacturer

Coordinates: 40.74969375°N 73.988025°W

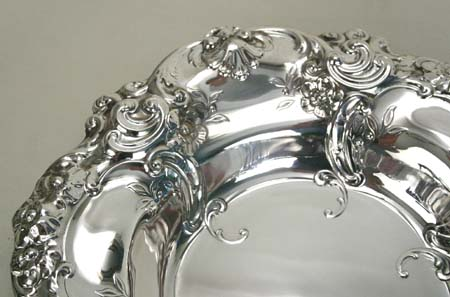
Border detail of a "Melrose" pattern bowl by Gorham

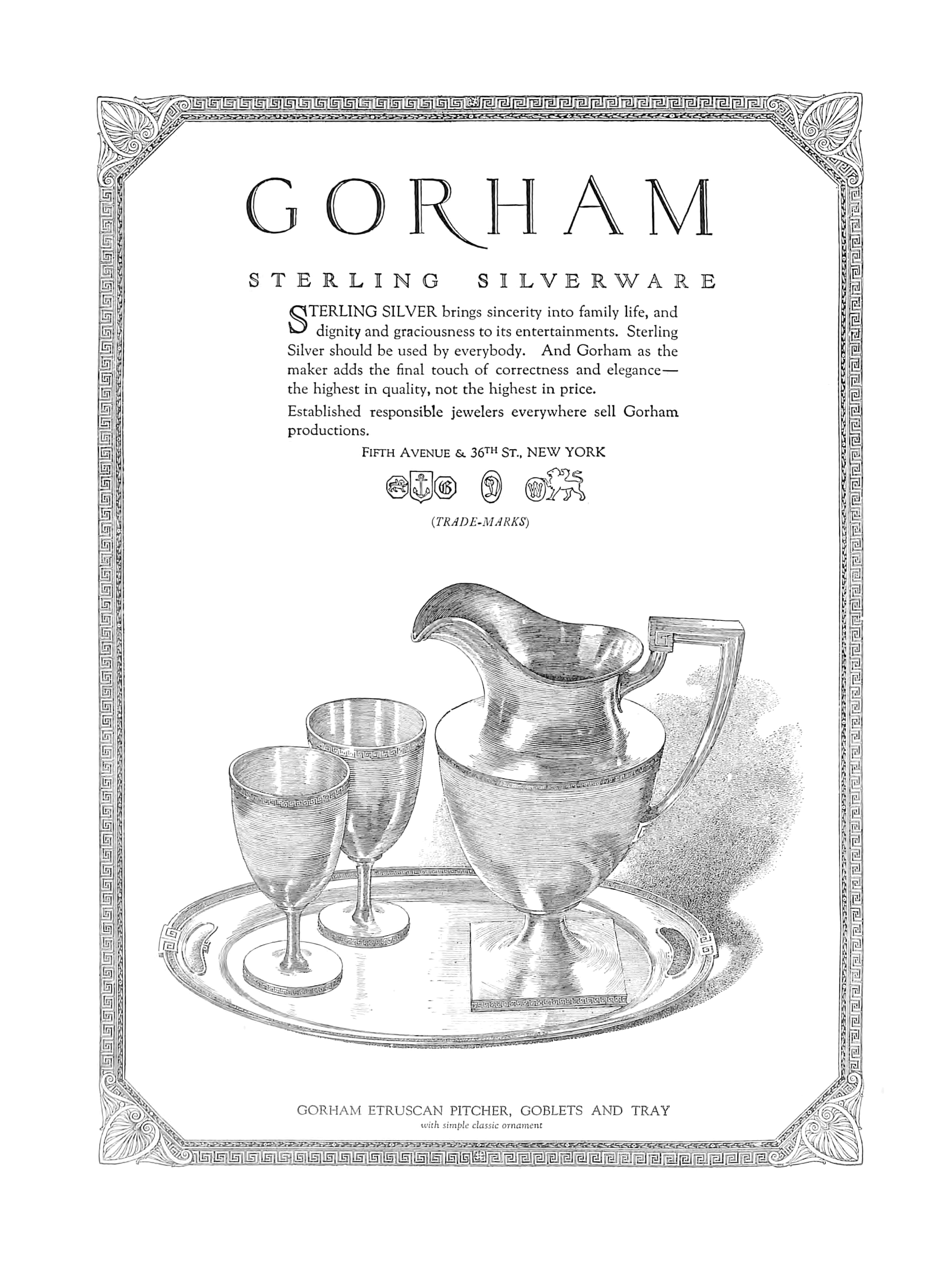
A Gorham advertisement from 1923

The Gorham Manufacturing Company was one of the largest American manufacturers of sterling and silverplate and a foundry for bronze sculpture.

== History ==
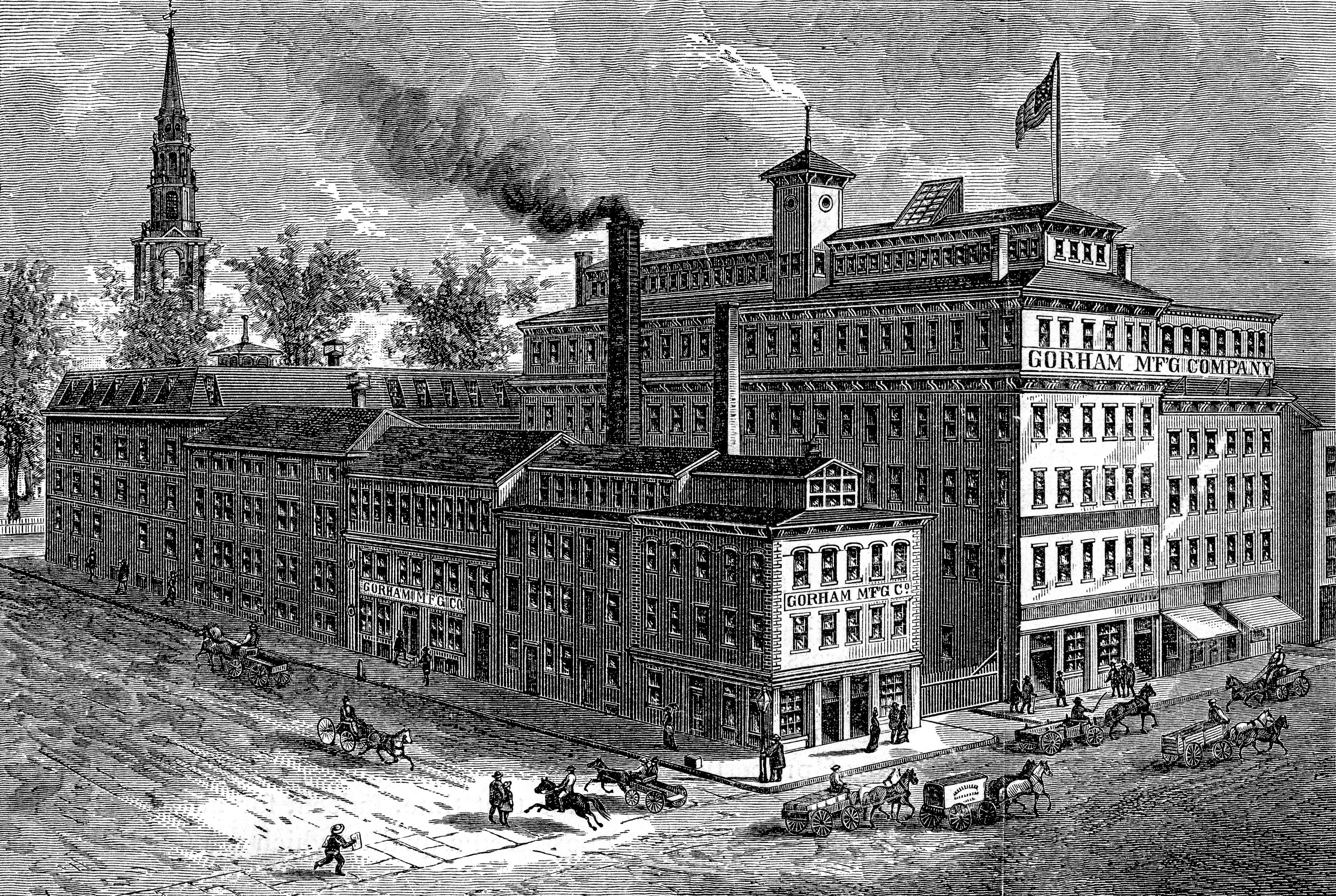
Gorham Manufacturing Company's Works. Canal, Steeple, and North Main Streets, Providence, 1886

Gorham Silver was founded in 1831 in Providence, Rhode Island by Jabez Gorham, a master craftsman, in partnership with Henry L. Webster. The firm's chief product was spoons of coin silver. The company also made thimbles, combs, jewelry, and other small items. In 1842, the Congress enacted a tariff which effectively blocked the importation of silverware from outside the United States, which aided the American silver industry. Jabez Gorham did not take full advantage of this opportunity, but in 1847 Jabez retired and his son, John Gorham succeeded him as head of the company.

John Gorham introduced mechanized production methods, enlarged the premises in downtown Providence, improved the designs, and expanded the product line. In 1852, Gorham toured many of Europe's silver workshops and manufacturers, speaking with individual specialists, including master craftsmen and toolmakers. He sought highly skilled foreign workmen to train his American workers and hired George Wilkinson, a premier designer and workshop manager, from England. In 1865, the Rhode Island legislature granted a charter in the name of Gorham Manufacturing Company and in 1890, the company relocated to a factory on Adelaide Avenue in Providence.

During the heyday of American silver manufacturing, from 1850 to 1940, Gorham was highly influential. William Christmas Codman, one of Gorham's most noted designers, created the Chantilly design in 1895, which has become the most famous of Gorham's flatware patterns. The company has produced matching hollowware in both sterling and silverplate.

In 1884, the company opened a store in the Ladies' Mile shopping district in Manhattan, New York City, but moved in 1905 to a Fifth Avenue building which it commissioned from architect Stanford White. In 1906, Gorham purchased another long-time rival, New Jersey–based Kerr & Co. In 1924, the company absorbed the Massachusetts jewelry company Whiting Manufacturing Company, founded by William Dean Whiting in 1866.

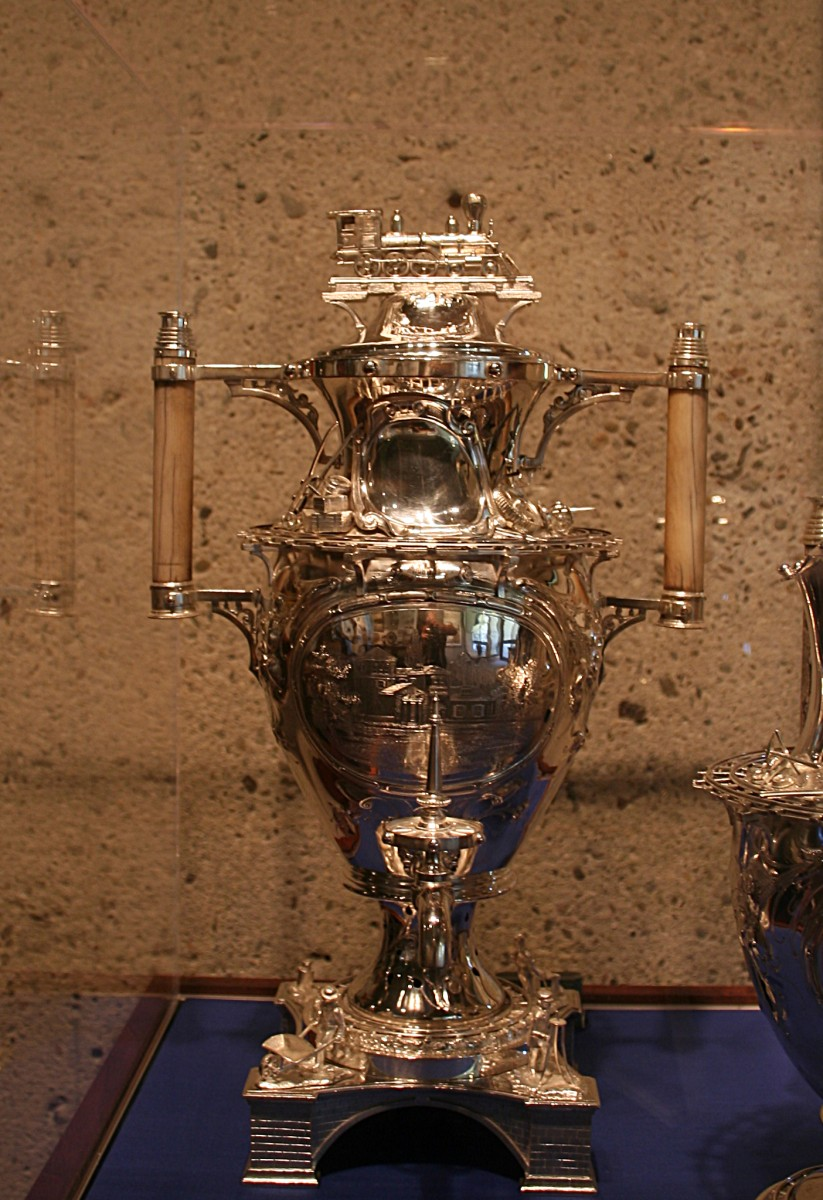
Piece created for Edward Dickinson Baker

Textron purchased the company in 1967, a move that some critics claim decreased quality due to management's lack of understanding of Gorham's specialty, producing high-quality sterling silverware and holloware. Textron began planning to sell the unit in 1988, completing the sale in 1989 to Dansk International Designs. Brown-Forman Corporation acquired Gorham from Dansk in 1991. The unit was sold in 2005 to Department 56 in the Lenox holdings transaction, with the resulting company renamed as Lenox Group.

However, in 2009 Lenox Group filed for Chapter 11 bankruptcy and it was subsequently acquired by Clarion Capital Partners, now operating under the name Lenox Corporation, which has three operating divisions, Lenox, Dansk, and Gorham.

== Major commissions ==
The White House has used Gorham silver services during many administrations. Mary Todd Lincoln purchased an impressive tea and flatware service for use in the White House in 1859. The tea service was presented to the National Museum of American History in 1957. Mrs. Ulysses S. Grant asked Gorham to commemorate the country's one-hundredth anniversary with a spectacular Century Vase that contained over 2,000 oz (57,000 g) of sterling silver, and in 1899, it produced a grand "loving cup" composed of 70,000 dimes was designed for Admiral George Dewey. Colonel Henry Jewett Furber, president of Universal Life Insurance Company of New York, placed the largest single commission Gorham ever received for what became known as the famous Furber service. The opulent 740-piece service represents Victorian era dining at its most elaborate. The monumental silver and parcel-gilt "Neptune" epergne made for Furber as part of this service was displayed at the Philadelphia Centennial Exposition in 1876. Textron donated a large portion of the service along with other pieces to the Rhode Island School of Design Museum and they are on display in the permanent collection of American decorative arts.

In 1907, Gorham created an elaborate silver service for the battleship USS Rhode Island. When the Rhode Island was decommissioned following World War I, the US Navy returned the service to the state for public display. It is now on display in the State Room of the Rhode Island State House. The George W. Bush family chose Gorham's Chantilly as the flatware service on Air Force One.

In 1910, the AEIC (Association of Edison Illuminating Companies) commissioned a small bronze Bust of Thomas Edison (3.75" tall) from Gorham Designers Wm. C. & E. E. Codman. Edison personally attended the 26th Annual Convention at the Hotel Frontenac on Sep. 7 and all 173 Attendees received the one-pound Souvenirs. Several of the little sculptures still survive (one in Glenmont, NJ), and historian Allen Koenigsberg is still seeking the paper trail for their creation.

In 1921, the company bought the rights to The Hiker, a statue by Theo Alice Ruggles Kitson. It commemorates the American soldiers who fought in the Spanish–American War, the Boxer Rebellion and the Philippine–American War. Over the next 44 years Gorham cast at least 50 Hiker statues. A copy can be found in Providence's Kennedy Plaza, and there are several in nearby Massachusetts towns including Lynn, Wakefield, Haverhill, Taunton and Fall River.

Gorham artisans also sculpted the famous monument of George Washington in the Capitol's Rotunda, the statue of Theodore Roosevelt that overlooks the Museum of Natural History in New York, and the famous Independent Man which tops the Rhode Island State House.

Gorham designed a number of elaborate trophies for sporting events, including the Borg-Warner Trophy for the Indianapolis 500, designed by Robert J. Hill.

== European recognition ==
In 1886 a commentator wrote in the London Magazine of Art:

If we go to one of the first London silversmiths and ask for spoons and forks, we are met at once with the smiling query. "Yes, Sir; fiddle or old English?" Fiddle or old English! If we decline both those chaste designs we are assured that there is still a large selection of patterns remaining. The "Lily", the "Beaded", "King's Pattern", and "Queen's Pattern." There perforce, our choice must end....Mark the difference, in this one article, between the supine conservatism of the English manufacturers and the alertness and constant progress of the American maker. For instance [Gorham] would not be satisfied unless it produced every year or two new patterns, nearly all of which are beautiful, and of which they will produce a complete service of all articles for table use from a salt-spoon to a soup ladle.

In 1893, a French observer was surprised by America's "remarkable fertility in the variety of its patterns for table services." Of the flatware patterns designed by F. A. Heller (1839–1904) for Gorham he wrote "we have no idea of the richness of ornamentation of these services, and of the amount of talent expended by him in the engraving of the dies which he has made on the other side of the Atlantic."

== Buildings ==
=== Providence ===
The Gorham Manufacturing complex at Adelaide Avenue in Providence (demolished 1997)

The Gorham Manufacturing complex included over 30 buildings over a 37 acres in the Elmwood neighborhood of Providence. The site, located between Mashapaug Pond and Adelaide Avenue in an area called Reservoir Triangle, began operation in 1890 and closed in 1986. The City of Providence acquired the property in 1992 and demolished the buildings in 1997. In 2006, the Alvarez High School was built on the site despite extensive soil and groundwater contamination in the area. High levels of heavy metals, VOCs, PAHs, and dioxin are found in Mashapaug Cove.

=== New York City ===
Gorham Buildings

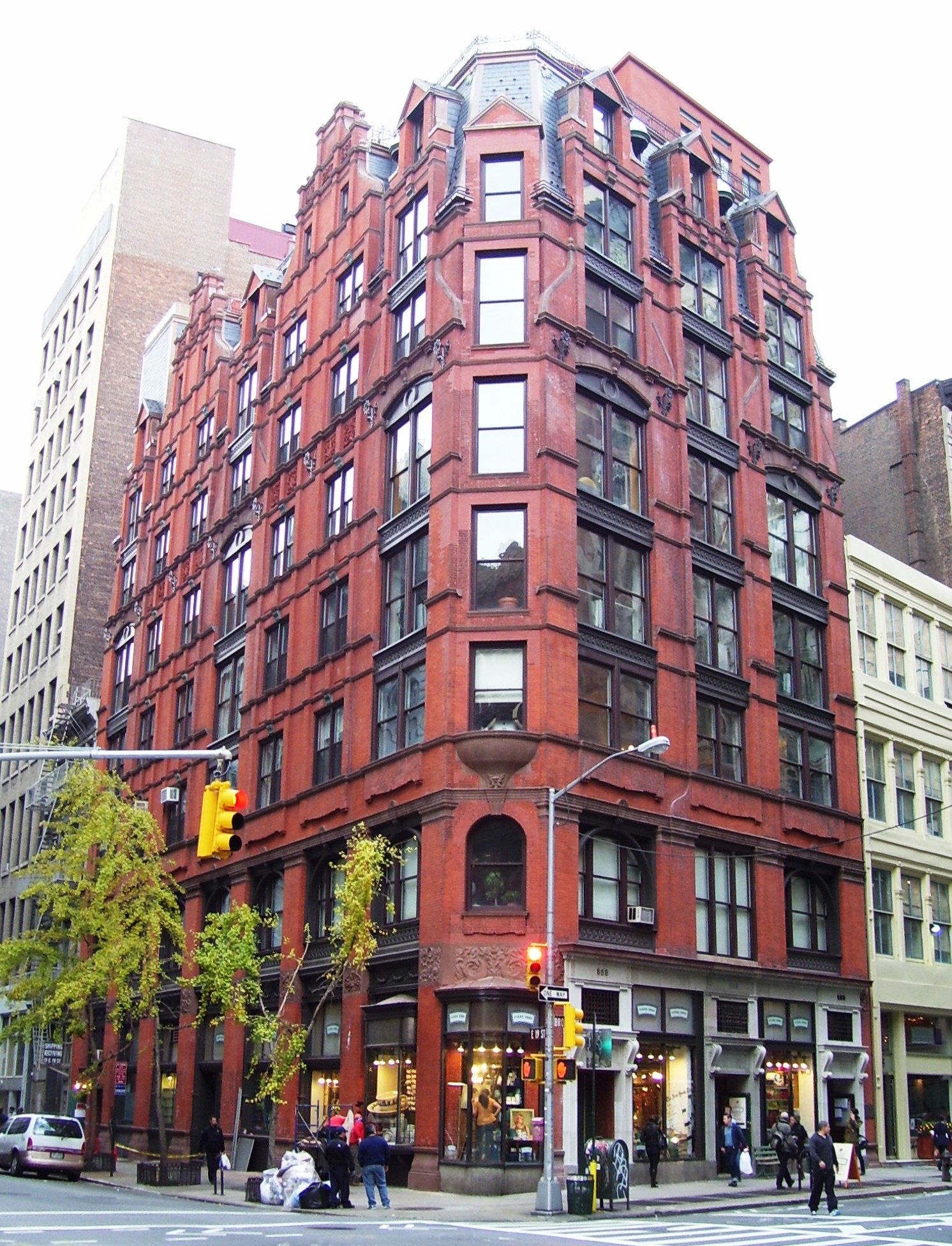
889–891 Broadway

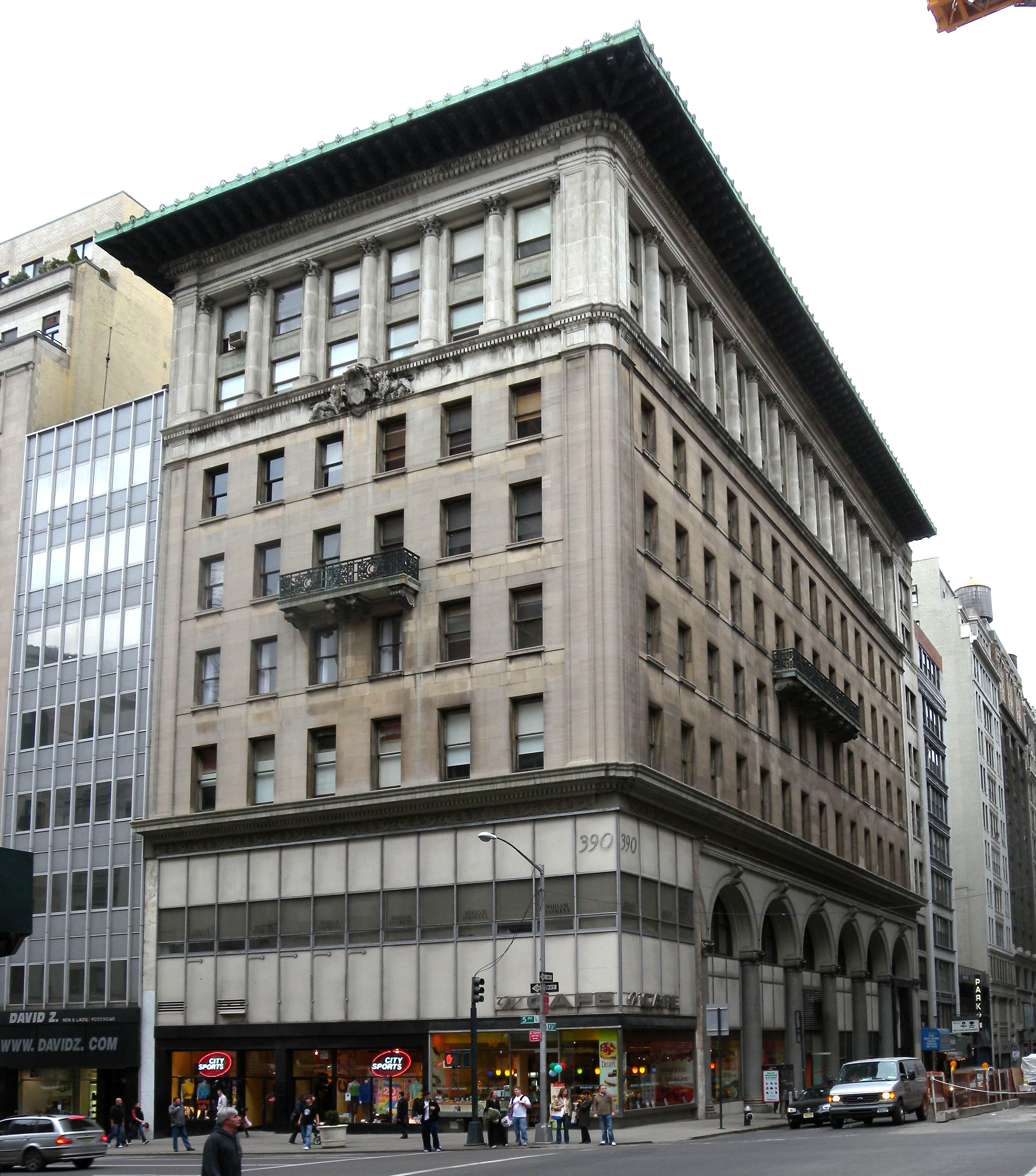
390 Fifth Avenue

Two buildings connected with the Gorham Manufacturing Company are designated as official New York City designated landmarks by the New York City Landmarks Preservation Commission.

==== Gorham Manufacturing Company Building ====
This Queen Anne style building located at 889–891 Broadway at the corner of East 19th Street in the Flatiron District of Manhattan, New York City, within the Ladies' Mile Historic District, was designed by Edward Hale Kendall and built in 1883–84 as the retail store of the company. At first, the company utilized the two lower floors with the remainder rented as bachelor apartments, but after a few years Gorham expanded into the rest of the building. The company left in 1905, and the building was converted by John H. Duncan in 1912 into lofts and offices, removing a corner tower and adding roof dormers. In 1977, it was restored to its original configuration, with a retail store on the ground floor and the remaining floors made into cooperative apartments. The building was designated a New York City landmark on June 19, 1984.

==== Gorham Building ====
When the company left its Ladies' Mile building, it moved to an Italian Renaissance Revival palazzo-style building at 390 Fifth Avenue at West 36th Street in the Murray Hill neighborhood. Designed by McKim, Mead & White, with Stanford White as the partner in charge, and built in 1904–1906, the building features bronze balconies and friezes designed by Gorham's staff, and is topped by a copper cornice. From 1924 to 1959, it was home to Russeks department store, and then Spear Securities from 1960, who changed the street level facade. It was designated a New York City landmark in December 1998, but not before the lower floors were significantly altered from their original design.

== Gorham as a sculpture foundry ==
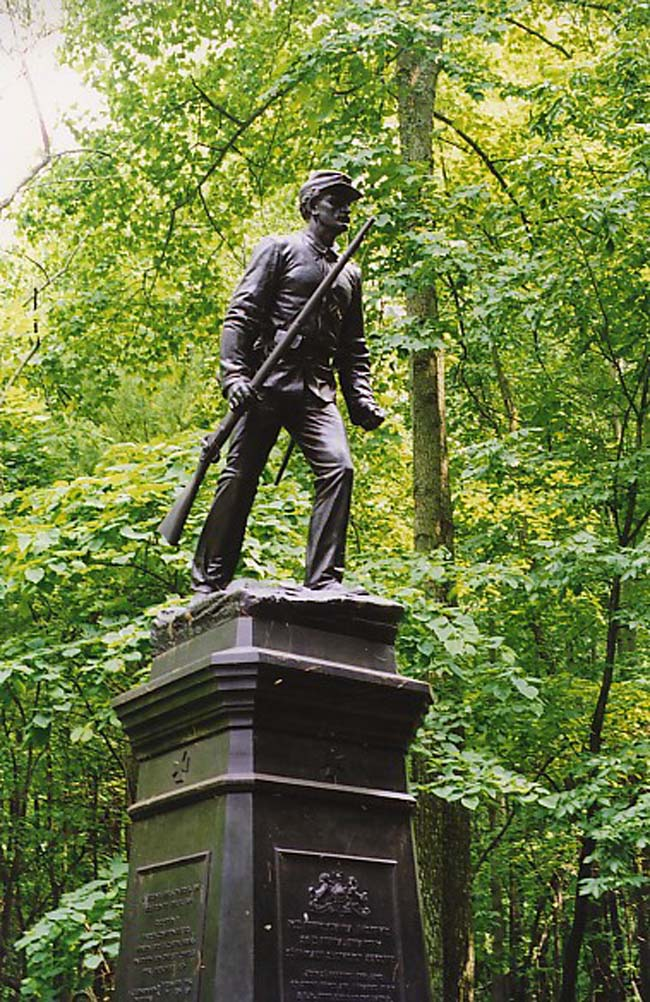
The Skirmishers, 1889

In the early 1880s Gorham began casting ecclesiastical items, such as lecterns and in 1889 the cast its first statue, The Skirmisher by Frederick Kohlhagen, located at Gettysburg National Military Park.

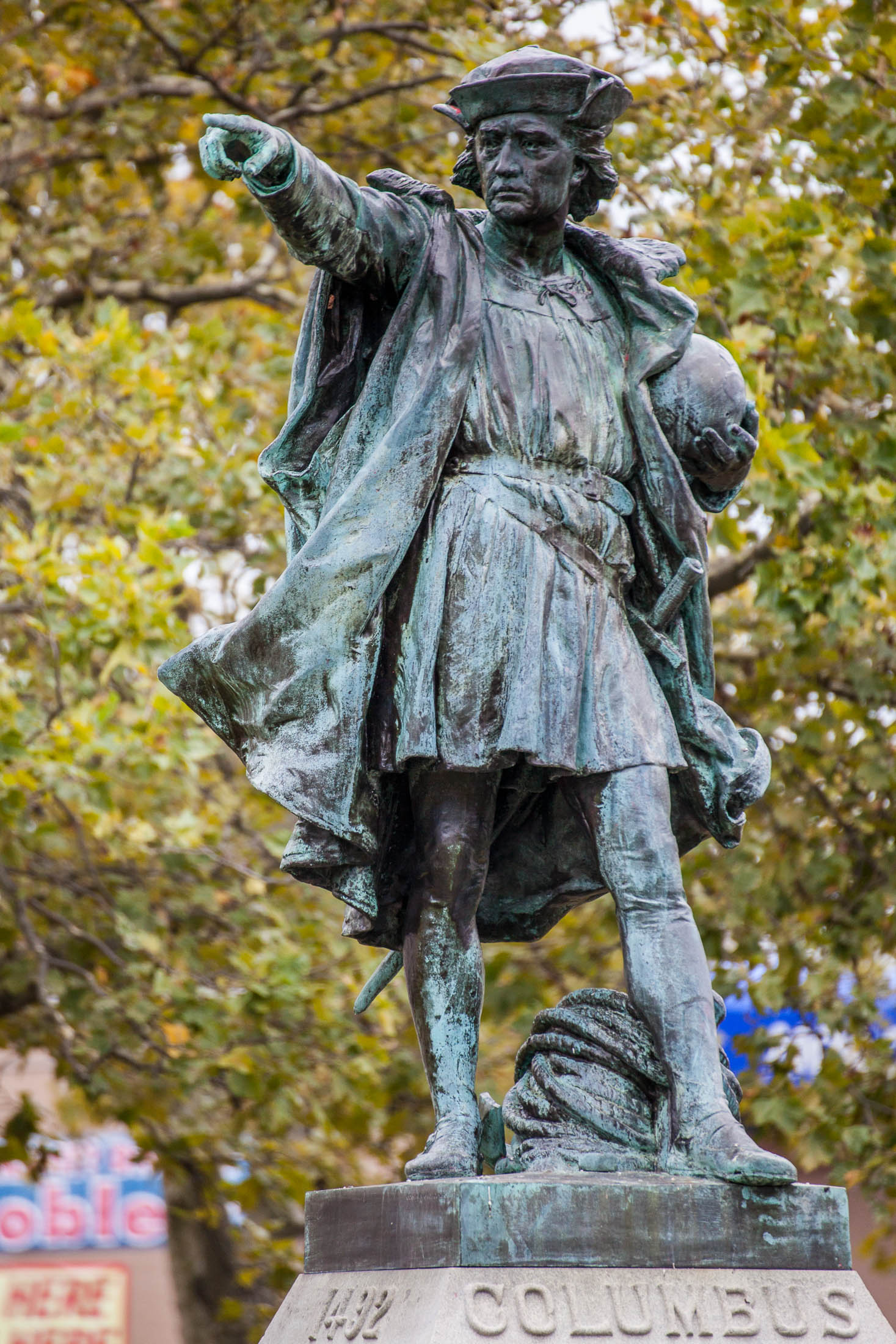
Christopher Columbus, 1892/1893

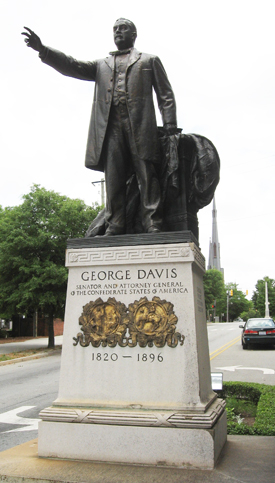
George Davis, confederate senator and attorney general 1911

To promote its new business of statuary, the company cast a sterling silver statue of Christopher Columbus for the 1893 World's Columbian Exposition in Chicago. The statue was designed by famed French sculptor Frédéric Auguste Bartholdi, best known for designing the Statue of Liberty. Since the silver statue was a temporary advertisement, it was melted down after the exhibition. In 1893 a replica of the statue was cast in bronze and donated to the city of Providence by the Elmwood Association. The statue was removed in June 2020.

In 1896, its casting of W. Granville Hastings bust, Judge Carpenter was the first in America using the lost-wax casting method. The foundry went on to become one of the leading art foundries in the United States.

The firm also cast "Lost Cause" Confederate monuments for chapters of the United Daughters of the Confederacy, such as the George Davis Monument (by Francis Herman Packer) in Wilmington, NC in 1910.

A 1928 book published by the Gorham Company, Famous Small Bronzes – A Representative Exhibit Selected from the Works of Noted Contemporary Sculptors, featured full page photographs of sculptures by such notable sculptors as: Chester Beach, Gutzon Borglum, Allan Clark, Cyrus Dallin, Abastenia St. Leger Eberle, Laura Gardin Fraser, Harriet Frishmuth, Emil Fuchs, Karl Gruppe, Anna Hyatt Huntington, Isidore Konti, R. Tait McKenzie, Edith Parsons, Alexander Phimister Proctor, and Mahonri Young. The company also cast monumental works for such figures of the American Renaissance as Augustus Saint Gaudens, Daniel Chester French and James Earle Fraser. Information about the small (lost-wax) Bronze Busts of Thomas Edison (almost 4" tall) is sought by historian Allen Koenigsberg. They were modeled by E. E. Codman and distributed at the Hotel Frontenac by the AEIC on the Convention night of Sep 7, 1910.

The Smithsonian archives of American art list Gorham foundry over 700 times in its inventory of American sculpture.

== See also ==
- Martelé (silver)
