= Daniel Hastings =

Daniel Hastings may refer to:

- Daniel H. Hastings (1849–1903), Governor of Pennsylvania, 1895–99
- Daniel O. Hastings (1874–1966), Senator from Delaware, 1928–37
- Daniel E. Hastings, American physicist
