= Anne Hastings =

Anne Hastings may refer to:

- Anne Hastings, Countess of Pembroke, née Manny (1355–1384)
- Anne Hastings, Countess of Shrewsbury, (c.1471–1520), wife of George Talbot, 4th Earl of Shrewsbury
- Anne Hastings, Countess of Huntingdon, née Stafford (c.1483–1544), mistress of Henry VIII
