= Edward Hastings (cricketer) =

Australian cricketer

Personal information
- Born: c. 1849; England
- Died: 31 May 1905 (aged 55–56); McKinnon, Victoria, Australia

Domestic team information
- Years: Team
- 1875-1878: Victoria
- Source: Cricinfo, 7 June 2015

Edward Hastings (c. 1849 – 31 May 1905) was an Australian cricketer. He played two first-class cricket matches for Victoria between 1875 and 1878.

== See also ==
- List of Victoria first-class cricketers
