= George Hastings (Christchurch MP) =

English landowner and politician

Sir George Hastings (c. 1588–1657) was an English landowner and politician who sat in the House of Commons from 1621 to 1622.

== Biography ==
Hastings was the son of Henry Hastings of Puddletown, Dorset, who was described as a great country sportsman. He was knighted on 5 November 1615. In 1621, he was elected Member of Parliament for Christchurch.

== Family ==
Hastings married Alice Freke, daughter of Sir Thomas Freke and Elizabeth Taylor on 27 July 1614. She was buried at Christchurch on 24 July 1634. After Hastings' death the estates passed to his daughter Frances, who married John Roy of London.

Parliament of England
| Preceded by Sir Thomas Norton; Henry Breton | Member of Parliament for Christchurch; 1621–1622; With: Nathaniel Tomkins | Succeeded by Nathaniel Tomkins; Sir George Astmyll |
