= Elizabeth Hastings =

Elizabeth Hastings may refer to:

- Elizabeth Hastings, Countess of Worcester (before 1556 – 1621), daughter of Francis Hastings, 2nd Earl of Huntingdon and wife of Edward Somerset, 4th Earl of Worcester
- Elizabeth Hastings, Countess of Huntingdon (1588–1633), daughter of Ferdinando Stanley, 5th Earl of Derby, and Alice Spencer
- Elizabeth Hastings (born about 1605), daughter of Henry Hastings, 5th Earl of Huntingdon and Lady Elizabeth Stanley
- Lady Elizabeth Hastings (1682–1739), known as Lady Betty, daughter of Theophilus Hastings, 7th Earl of Huntingdon, philanthropist
- Elizabeth Rawdon, Countess of Moira (1731–1808), née Elizabeth Hastings
