= Natasha Hastings (writer) =

British children's author

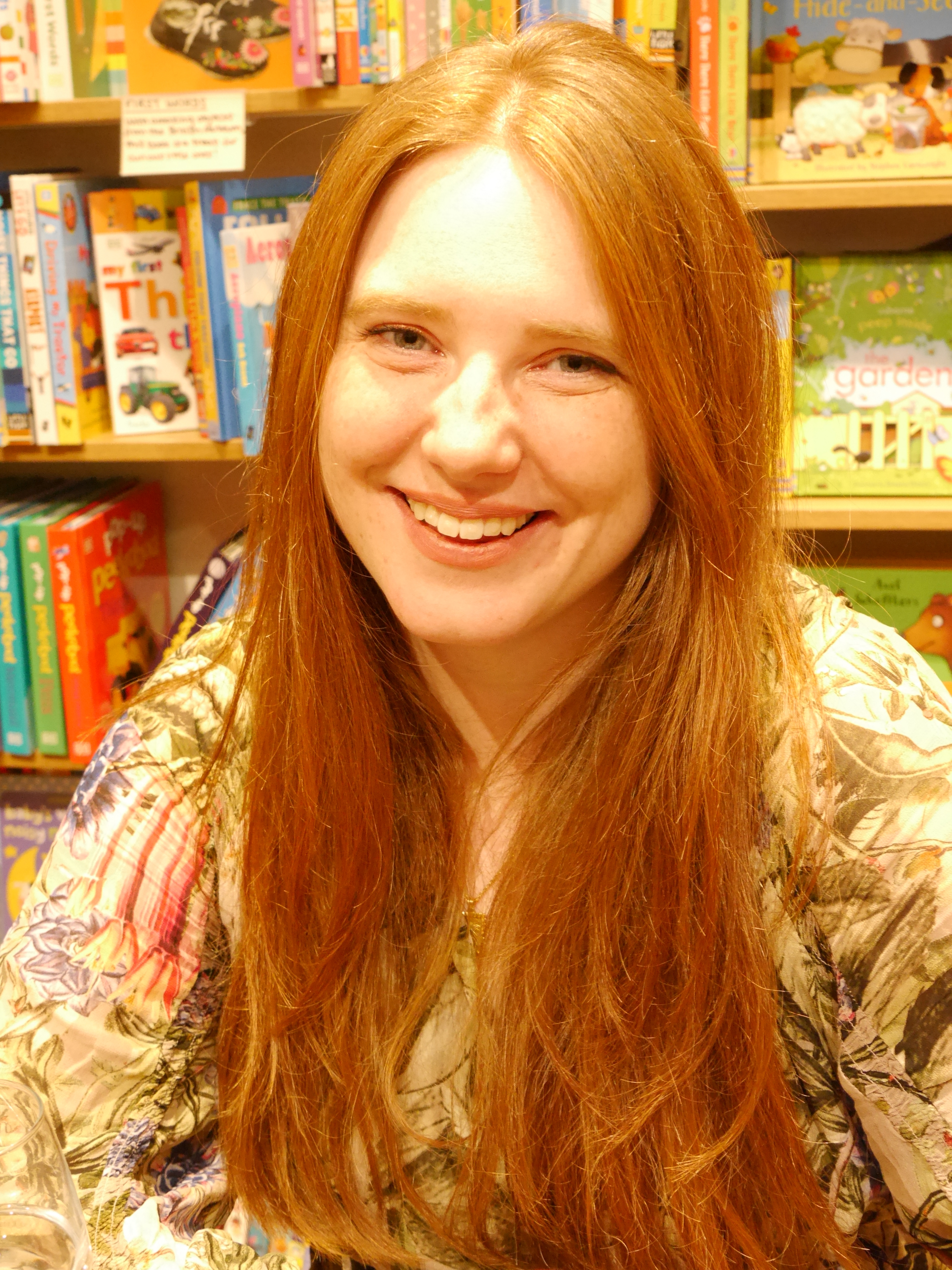
Hastings at Waterstones, London in 2024

Natasha Hastings is a British children's author.

== Life and career ==
Hastings studied history at the University of Cambridge.

She signed with HarperCollins in 2021 to produce a magical-historical series for older children. Her 2023 book, The Miraculous Sweetmakers: The Frost Fair was called "an exceptional debut" by The Times. In November 2023, it was Waterstones Children’s Book of the Month, longlisted for the Branford Boase Award, and Editor’s Choice in The Bookseller.

The second volume of the projected trilogy, The Miraculous Sweetmakers: The Sea Queen, was published in 2024. Both books are illustrated by Alex T. Smith.

She writes for adults as Natasha J. Hastings, with How to Charm a Viscount due in 2025.

== Publications ==
=== As Natasha Hastings ===
- The Miraculous Sweetmakers: The Frost Fair HarperCollins, 2023
- The Miraculous Sweetmakers: The Sea Queen HarperCollins, 2024

=== As Natasha J. Hastings ===
- How to Charm a Viscount HarperCollins, 2025
