= Henry Hastings (sportsman) =

English landowner and country sportsman

Henry Hastings (c. 1561 – 15 October 1650), was an English landowner and country sportsman. He supported the Royalist cause in the English Civil War.

== Life ==
Hastings was second son of George Hastings, 4th Earl of Huntingdon. There seems to be some confusion as to his date of birth, which is said to have been 1551 by the Dictionary of National Biography, but is actually around a decade later. He acquired the estate of Puddletown from James I. Through his marriage, he acquired Woodlands Park, near Horton, Dorset, together with other parts of the old estate of the Filiols, where he lived.

Hastings supported the King in the Civil war and in 1645 his estate at Woodlands, valued in 1641 at £300, was sequestered. He later compounded for his property by the sum of £500.

== Reputation ==
Hastings was the typical country squire of the time, "well-natured, but soon angry." He always dressed in green, and keeping all sorts of hounds and hawks, devoted himself to hunting. His hall was hung with sporting trophies, while favourite dogs and cats occupied every corner. His table was provided from his farms and fishponds, and hospitable. The pulpit of a disused neighbouring chapel formed his larder.

An account was written of him by Sir Anthony Ashley Cooper, 1st Earl of Shaftesbury, and was inscribed on a portrait of him at Lord Shaftesbury's seat, Winterbourne St. Giles. Other details of his domestic economy may be found in Shaftesbury's character, which was first printed in Leonard Howard's Collection of Letters and State Papers, 1753; it was reprinted in the 'Connoisseur,’ No. 81, 14 Aug. 1755. Dr. Drake (who printed it in William Hone's Everyday Book, ii. 1624) omitted some disparaging remarks; Shaftesbury himself lived near Hastings's residence, and was a Parliamentarian.

Hastings married Dorothy Willoughby, second daughter and coheiress of Sir Francis Willoughby (the builder of Wollaton, Nottinghamshire). She died on 15 December 1638. On 1 Jun 1639 he settled part of his estate on Anne Langton of Woodlands, spinster daughter of William Langton, and they later married, but she is not mentioned in his epitaph. Woodlands passed into the hands of the Roy family, and was subsequently added to Lord Shaftesbury's estate.

He was buried with his wife and their son, Sir George Hastings, who died in 1657, in the Hastings aisle in the belfry of the old church of Horton.
