= Hollowware =

Type of metal tableware

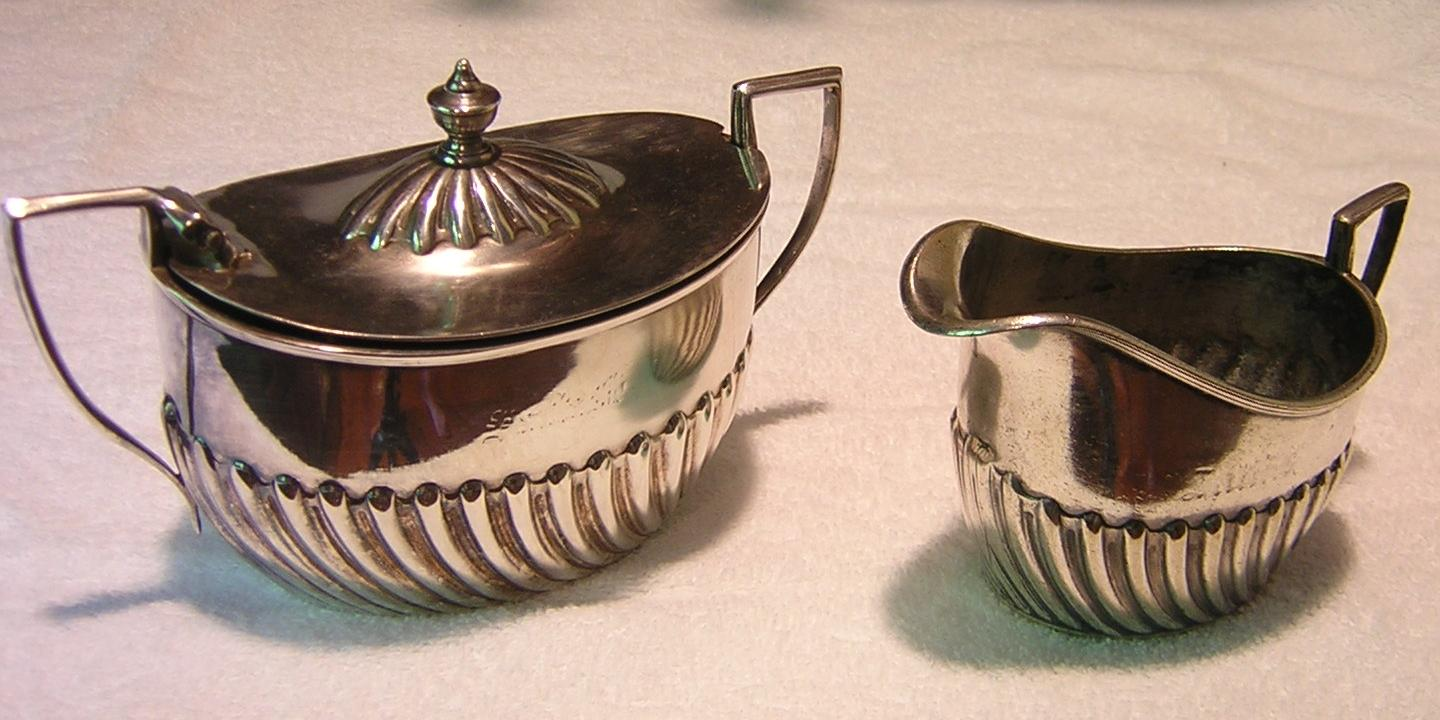
Creamer and sugar bowl from Atchison, Topeka and Santa Fe Railway service, made by Harrison Brothers & Howson for dining car service

Hollowware or holloware is tableware that forms a vessel or container of some kind, as opposed to flatware such as plates. Examples include sugar bowls, creamers, coffee pots, teapots, soup tureens, hot food covers, and jugs. It may be in pottery, metals such as silver, iron, glass or plastic. It does not include cutlery or other metal utensils. Hollowware is constructed for durability. It differs from some other silver-plated items, with thicker walls and more layers of silver plating.

== Background ==
Dining car hollowware is a type of railroad collectible (railroadiana). The relative value of pieces depends on their scarcity, age and condition, and the popularity of the trains on which the items were used. Railroads marked this hollowware with information such as the railroad's name or logo and the name of the manufacturer.

Hollowware is the traditional gift in the UK and the modern gift in the US for the 16th wedding anniversary. Hollowware is the traditional gift for jubilee or wedding in Russia.
