= English (surname) =

English is an English surname.

The name is attested from the 12th century. From parts of Great Britain near the borders of England with Scotland and Wales, it may have been applied to people who spoke English, or to distinguish people of English ancestry from Celts, while from the interior of England it may have referred to people who were English rather than Norman French in ancestry. In other parts of Europe it may have been given to travellers from England. In Ireland the name is of Norman origin and had been brought to the country in the twelfth century.

== People ==
Notable people with the surname include:

=== A ===
- A. J. English (born 1967), American former basketball player
  - A. J. English (basketball, born 1992), American basketball player, his son
- Ada English (1875–1944), Irish politician and psychiatrist
- Adam English (born 2003), Irish hurler
- Alan D. English, American physicist
- Alex English (born 1954), American former basketball player, coach, and businessman
- Alex English (comedian), American comedian and writer
- Amber English (born 1989), American sport shooter
- Andy English (born 1956), English wood-engraver and educator
- Ann English, Irish-Canadian scientist and bioinorganic chemist
- Arthur English (1919–1995), English actor and comedian
- Arthur B. English (1869–1938), Canadian executioner
- Austin English (born 1983), American cartoonist and artist
- Auston English (born 1987), former American football defensive end

=== B ===
- Bradford English (1942–2024), American actor
- Buck English (1855–1915), American Old West outlaw

=== C ===
- CariDee English (born 1984), American model and television personality
- Carl English (born 1981), Canadian former basketball player and manager
- Carlos English, American basketball player
- Cedric English (born 1973), South African-born Scottish cricketer
- Charles English (disambiguation) or Charlie English, multiple people
- Clara English, pen name of Clara Christiana Morgan Chapin (1852–1926), British-born American activist, newspaper editor, temperance worker, woman suffragist and writer
- Claude English (born 1946), American former basketball player and coach
- Colin English (1895–1986), American superintendent
- Corri English (born 1978), American actress
- Cory English (born 1968), American actor
- Crystal English Sacca (born Crystal English), American venture investor and author

=== D ===
- Damien English (born 1978), Irish politician
- David English (disambiguation), multiple people
- Deirdre English (born 1948), American journalist, daughter of Fanita and Maurice English
- Des English (born 1958), Australian former footballer
- Diane English (born 1948), American director, producer and screenwriter
- Dion English (born 1971), United States Navy vice admiral
- Doreen Mary English, birth name of Drue Heinz (1915–2018), English-born American actress, arts patron, philanthropist of literature and socialite
- Doug English (born 1953), American former football player

=== E ===
- Edmond J. English (born 1953), American businessman
- Edmund English (1841–1912), American soldier and Medal of Honor recipient
- Edward English (1864–1966), English cricketer
- Elbert H. English (1816–1884), American judge
- Ellia English, American actress, dancer and singer
- Elsa English (born 2008), Australian entrepreneur and founder of digital platform LINQ.
- Emily English (born 1995), English nutritionist, food writer, Internet personality and former model
- Ernest English (1874–1941), English actor, cricketer and soldier
- Evan English, Australian filmmaker, co-writer and producer of the 1988 film Ghosts... of the Civil Dead

=== F ===
- Fanita English (1916–2022), Romanian-born American psychoanalyst and psychotherapist
- Felix English (born 1992), English cyclist
- Fenwick W. English (born 1939), American writer and education professor

=== G ===
- Garry English (1935–2007), Australian former footballer
- George English (disambiguation), multiple people
- Gerald English (1925–2019), English tenor
- Gil English (1909–1996), American baseball player
- Gladys English (died 1956), American editor and librarian
- Glenn English (born 1940), American businessman, lobbyist, politician and soldier
- Glenn H. English Jr. (1940–1970), American soldier and Medal of Honor recipient
- Grace English (1891–1956), English painter
- Graeme English (1964–2021), British wrestler

=== H ===
- Hal English, American lawyer and politician
- Harold English, pseudonym of Raymond Harold Sawkins (1923–2006), English novelist and writer
- Harris English (born 1989), American golfer
- Hazel English, Australian-American musician
- Helen Williams Drutt English, full name of Helen Drutt (born 1930), American author, educator, gallerist and lecturer
- Henry English (died 1393), English politician

=== I ===
- Irvino English (1977–2020), Jamaican footballer
- Isaac English (born 1971), Scottish former footballer
- Isobel English (also known as June Guesdon Braybrooke, née Jolliffe; 1920–1994), English novelist and writer

=== J ===
- J. Kalani English, American former politician
- Jack English (disambiguation), multiple people
- Jackie English, Canadian actress, choreographer, dancer, director, filmmaker, performer and television host
- James English (disambiguation), multiple people
- Jane English (born 1942), American artist, author, photographer and physicist
- Jane English (politician) (born 1940), American politician
- Jaren Holmes (born 1998 as Jaren Jamir English)
- Jayanne English, Canadian astronomer
- Jennifer English, English actress
- Jesse English (born 1984), American former baseball player
- Jim English (1932–2008), Irish hurler
- Jo Jo English (born 1970), American basketball coach and former player
- Joe English (disambiguation) or Joseph English, multiple people
- John English (disambiguation), multiple people
- Jon English (1949–2016), English-born Australian actor, musician and singer-songwriter
- Jonathan English (director), English director and producer
- Josephine English (1920–2011), American gynecologist
- Josias English (died 1705), English artist and etcher
- Judie English (1947–2025), British archaeologist
- Judith English (born 1940), English acadmedic administrator
- Junior English (1951–2023; born Lindel Beresford English)

=== K ===
- Karan English (born 1949), American politician
- Katreeya English (born 1976), Thai actress, model, singer and television host
- Keith English (disambiguation), multiple people
- Ken English (1927–2016), New Zealand rugby league footballer
- Kim English (1970–2019), American singer
- Kim English (basketball) (born 1988), American basketball coach and former player

=== L ===
- Larry English (born 1986), American former football player
- Lauren English (born 1989), American swimmer
- Lawrence English (born 1976), Australian artist, composer and curator
- Leandra English, American government official and political advisor
- Leo James English (1907–1997), Australian compiler, editor, lexicographer, linguist and priest
- Logan English (1928–1983), American MC, musician, playwright, poet and singer
- Lorenzo English (1819–1888), American politician
- Louis English (1902–1976), American baseball player
- Louise English (born 1962), English actress
- Lowell E. English (1915–2005), American soldier and U.S. Marine Corps Major General
- Lyn English, Australian mathematics education scholar

=== M ===
- Maddy English (1925–2004), American baseball player
- Mark English (disambiguation), multiple people
- Marla English (1935–2012), American actress
- Mary English (disambiguation), multiple people
- Matty English (born 1997), English rugby league footballer
- Maurice English (1909–1983), American author, journalist and poet
- Michael English (disambiguation) or Mick English, multiple people
- Mitch English (born 1969), American actor, comedian, keynote speaker, radio and television talk show host and personality, reporter and weatherman
- Myra English (1933–2001), American musician and singer

=== N ===
- Niall J. English, Irish chemical engineer, inventor and researcher
- Nick English (born 1978), British rower
- Nicky English (born 1962), Irish former hurler
- Nicole Williams English (born 1983), Canadian model and fashion designer, full surname is Williams English

=== O ===
- O. Spurgeon English (1901–1993), American psychiatrist and psychoanalyst
- Oliver English, pseudonym of Clive McLean (1944–2005), English photographer
- Otto English (born Andrew Scott), English author and journalist

=== P ===
- Paschal English (born 1944), retired United States Air Force Colonel, former judge, and contestant on the fourth season of Survivor, Survivor: Marquesas
- Pat English, Irish former hurler
- Patricia English (1931–2016), American-born British actress
- Paul English (disambiguation), multiple people
- Pauline English, Australian Paralympic swimmer
- Peter English (1937–2009), Scottish scientist, shinty player and social historian
- Peter English (boxer) (born 1963), British retired boxer
- Phil English (born 1956), American politician
- Phoebe English, English fashion designer

=== R ===
- Rachael English (born 1968), Irish broadcaster and writer
- Ralna English (born 1942), American singer
- Regina English, American politician
- Richard English (born 1963), Northern Irish academic, historian, political scientist and writer
- Richard English (cricketer) (1942–2024), English cricketer
- Richie English (born 1995), Irish hurler
- Robert English (disambiguation), multiple people
- Roger Guy English (born 1950), American businessman and disc jockey
- Roland English (1909–1993), Canadian politician
- Ron English (born 1959), American artist
- Ron English (American football) (born 1968), American football coach and former player
- Rose English, British actress, artist, choreographer and director
- Roy English, former professional name of Jagwar Twin (born 1988), American musician, record producer and singer-songwriter

=== S ===
- Sam English (1908–1967), Northern Irish footballer
- Sarah English (born 1955), Zimbabwean former field hockey player
- Scott English (1937–2018), American arranger, record producer and songwriter
- Scott English (basketball) (born 1950), American former basketball player
- Sharon English (born 1965), Canadian writer
- Stacey English (1975–2012), formerly missing American person

=== T ===
- T. J. English (born 1957), American author and journalist
- Terence English (1932–2025), South African-born British surgeon
- Terry English, British armourer and prop designer
- Theo English (1930–2021), Irish hurler
- Thomas English (disambiguation), Tom English or Tommy English, multiple people
- Tim English (born 1977) Australian rules footballer
- Todd English (born 1960), American author, celebrity chef, restaurateur and television personality
- Toni English, alternative name of Kelly Holland, American businesswoman director, producer and publisher
- Tony English (born 1966), English former footballer (born 1989),
- Tristin English (born 1997), American baseball player

=== V ===
- Vanessa English (born 1989), Brazilian jiu-jitsu black belt competitor and instructor from England
- Vin English (1929–1999), Australian rules footballer

=== W ===
- Wally English (1934–2024), American football coach
- Walter English (1867–1916), American composer, conductor and tubist
- Warren B. English (1840–1913), American politician and soldier
- William English (disambiguation) or Bill English, multiple people
- Winston English (born 1943), Guyanese former cricketer
- Woody English (1906–1997), American baseball player

== Fictional characters ==
- Jake English, in the web-comic Homestuck
- Johnny English, British spy in the Johnny English film series

== See also ==
- Justice English (disambiguation)
- Senator English (disambiguation)
- Englisch, a surname
- Inglis (surname)
- Pamela Hardt-English, American computer scientist and food scientist
