= Ashby School =

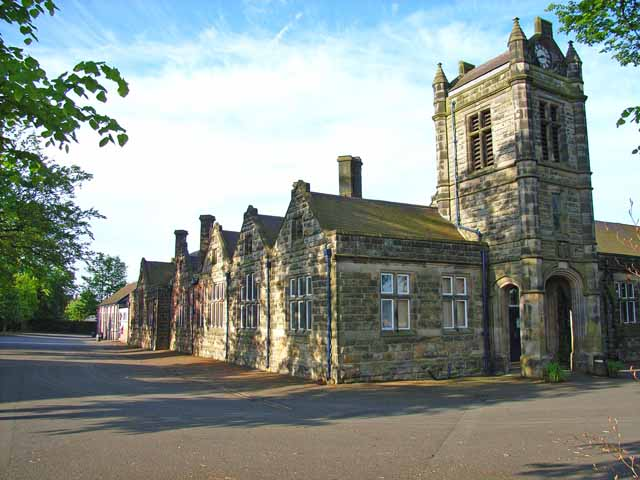

Location
- Nottingham Road; Ashby-de-la-Zouch, Leicestershire, LE65 1DT; England; 52°44′54″N 1°27′48″W

Information
- Type: Academy
- Established: 1567; 459 years ago
- Department for Education URN: 148549 Tables
- Ofsted: Reports
- Head teacher: Jude Mellor
- Gender: Coeducational
- Age: 11 to 19
- Enrolment: 1976
- Colours: Burgundy, Grey and Black
- Publication: The Ashbeian
- Former name: Ashby Grammar School
- Website: http://www.ashbyschool.org.uk

Ashby School, formerly known as Ashby Grammar School, is a co-educational comprehensive secondary school and sixth form in Ashby-de-la-Zouch, Leicestershire, England. The school is situated in the centre of Ashby on two sites.

== History ==
Ashby Grammar School, the original boys' school, was founded in 1567 by Henry Hastings, 3rd Earl of Huntingdon. The girls' grammar school opened in 1901. They merged in 1972 and became comprehensive. Ashby School became an academy on 1 October 2012.

Previously an upper school, in September 2022 the school expanded its age range to 11, and became a full secondary school.

=== Headteachers ===
- T. A. Woodcock OBE
- Charles Padel
- John Brinsley the Elder
- Dr Ron Allison
- David Edward Herbert
- Cedric Ingleton
- Vivian Keller Garnet
- Eddie Green
- Geoff Staniforth

=== Former teachers ===
- Sir Mike Tomlinson CBE, Chief Inspector of Schools from 2000 to 2002 (head of chemistry from 1969 to 1977)

== School site ==
Ashby School consists of two main sites, based on Nottingham Road (Blocks A, C, and S) and Leicester Road (Block B). From the 2020 academic year onwards, following Ofsted's safeguarding concerns of students crossing the road between the two sites, Block B became a designated Sixth Form campus. The Nottingham Road site now accommodates years 7-11 exclusively, and was recently extended to accommodate the growing number of students.

In 2019, a new sports pavilion was constructed on site after changing facilities on Range Road burnt down in a suspected arson attack. The new building includes four sets of changing rooms, showers, a performance space, and a small kitchen.

== Boarding accommodation ==
The school provided boarding accommodation for around 70 boys aged 11–19 attending Ashby School, Ivanhoe College and Ashby Church of England School. In 2019, Ofsted gave the boarding school a rating of 'inadequate', stating it was not delivering good help or care to its boarders.

Consequently, boarding provision was removed from the school, and the buildings re-purposed into a sixth form centre with study and dining spaces.

== School house system ==
Until 2019, the school had eight houses: Ashe (grey), Bullen (yellow), Crewe (orange), Erdington (red), Ferrers (blue), Gylby (pink), Hastings (green) and Loudoun (purple).

From 2019, the school has four houses: Bullen (yellow), Ferrers (blue), Hastings (green) and Loudoun (purple).

In 2021, a new sixth form house system was introduced. The new houses are Eagles (red), Falcons (blue), Hawks (green), and Kestrels (yellow). Since 2022, the senior team positions of head boy and head girl have been renamed to house captain.

== Performance ==
In January 2024, Ofsted gave the school a rating of 'Good' across all categories. The school was commended for its leadership, inclusivity, and high quality teaching.

In 2024, at least 70% of year 11 students achieved at least a Grade 4 in both English and Maths GCSEs.

At least 70% of year 13 students achieved three C+ grades in A-Levels, with over 20% of these grades being an A. 24% of year 13 students progressed to Russell Group universities.

== Medals controversy ==
In 2016, Ashby School created controversy when it proposed to auction the medals, including a Victoria Cross, won by Lt Col. Philip Bent that had been donated to the school "to inspire future pupils". The medals had been on long-term loan to the Royal Leicestershire Regimental Museum (part of Newarke Houses Museum), but had not been on display there for over forty years. The school planned to use the proceeds to fund the building of a sports pavilion. In 2018, the school received funding from the National Healthy Schools Programme for a new pavilion.

== Notable former pupils ==
Former pupils are known as Old Ashbeians.

- Andrew Betts, basketball player
- Henry Dartnall, popular musician
- Dorian West (former England Hooker)
- The Young Knives
- Nathan Buck (Leicestershire County and England U19 Cricket Player)
- Tom Hopper (actor, best known for playing Sir Percival in Merlin (TV Series) and Luther Hargreeves in Umbrella Academy)
- Sekou, singer
- Will Hurd, rugby player

=== Ashby-de-la-Zouch Boys’ Grammar School ===
- Sir Geoffrey Arthur, Master of Pembroke College, Oxford, 1975–84
- John Bainbridge (astronomer)
- Philip Bent, VC
- Sir John Bonser, barrister
- William Bradshaw, puritan
- Jack English, photographer
- Levi Fox, historian
- Anthony Gilby, clergyman
- Alexander Henry Green, geologist
- Leslie Hale, Baron Hale, Labour MP for Oldham from 1945 to 1950 and Oldham West from 1950 to 1968
- Joseph Hall, Bishop of Norwich
- Bert Hallam, medieval historian
- Thomas Hemsley CBE, baritone
- Sir Joseph Hood, 1st Baronet, Conservative MP from 1918 to 1924 for Wimbledon
- Sir James Hunt, judge
- Reginald Jacques CBE, conductor
- David Nish, footballer, capped five times for England
- David Taylor, Labour MP from 1997 to 2009 for North West Leicestershire
- Matthew Cooper, Technology Leader, Chairman 60 (Leek) Squadron Royal Air Force Air Cadets
- Bernard Vann, VC
- Sir John Walker, diplomat

=== Ashby-de-la-Zouch Girls' Grammar School ===
- Averil Burgess OBE, chairman from 1993 to 2000 of the Independent Schools Inspectorate, Headmistress from 1975 to 1993 of South Hampstead High School
- Nora David, Baroness David
- Clare Hollingworth, journalist
- Angela Piper, actress, plays Jennifer Aldridge (née Archer) in The Archers
- Jane Plant, geochemist, scientist, and author
- Diane Reay, professor of education at the University of Cambridge
