= Philip Bent =

Recipient of the Victoria Cross

Lieutenant Colonel Philip Bent VC DSO
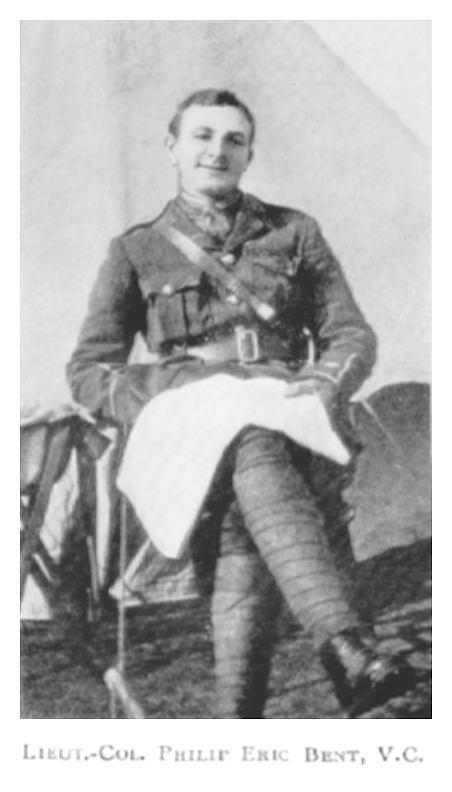
- Philip Bent during WWI.
- Born: Philip Eric Bent; 3 January 1891; Halifax, Nova Scotia, Canada
- Died: 1 October 1917 (aged 26) near Polygon Wood, Zonnebeke, Belgium
- Military career
- Allegiance: United Kingdom
- Branch: British Merchant Navy; British Army: British Expeditionary Force
- Service years: 1907-1914 (British Merchant Navy); 1914–1917 (British Army)
- Rank: Lieutenant Colonel
- Units: Leicestershire Regiment
- Conflicts: First World War: Battle of Passchendaele; Battle of Polygon Wood †
- Awards: Victoria Cross; Distinguished Service Order

Lieutenant Colonel Philip Eric Bent VC, DSO (3 January 1891 – 1 October 1917) was a Canadian British Army officer recipient of the Victoria Cross, the highest and most prestigious award for gallantry in the face of the enemy that can be awarded to British and Commonwealth forces.

== Biography ==
Bent was born on 3 January 1891 in Halifax, Nova Scotia, and was educated at the Royal High School, Edinburgh and Ashby Grammar School, Ashby-de-la-Zouch, Leicestershire. He joined the training ship HMS Conway in 1907. He served two years as a cadet and then went to sea. He was taking his Merchant Navy officer's ticket when the war broke out in 1914.

He and a friend joined a Scottish regiment "for a bit of fun" as the war was anticipated to be over by Christmas. He was commissioned in the Leicestershire Regiment, British Army, in November 1914.

Bent was awarded the Distinguished Service Order in the 1917 Birthday Honours.

He was 26 years old, and a temporary lieutenant-colonel commanding the 9th (Service) Battalion, Leicestershire Regiment, during the First World War when he performed the deed for which he was posthumously awarded the VC on 1 October 1917, east of Polygon Wood, Zonnebeke, Belgium. He was killed whilst leading a charge. His citation reads:

For most conspicuous bravery, when during a heavy hostile attack, the right of his own command and the battalion on his right were forced back. The situation was critical owing to the confusion caused by the attack and the intense artillery fire. Lt.-Col. Bent personally collected a platoon that was in reserve, and together with men from other companies and various regimental details, he organised and led them forward to the counter-attack, after issuing orders to other officers as to the further defence of the line. The counter-attack was successful and the enemy were checked.

The coolness and magnificent example shown to all ranks by Lt.-Col. Bent resulted in the securing of a portion of the line which was of essential importance for subsequent operations.

This very gallant officer was killed whilst leading a charge which he inspired with the call of "Come on the Tigers."

— The London Gazette, No. 30471, 11 January 1918

He has no known grave and is commemorated on the memorial wall at Tyne Cot Cemetery, Belgium.

== Legacy and medals ==
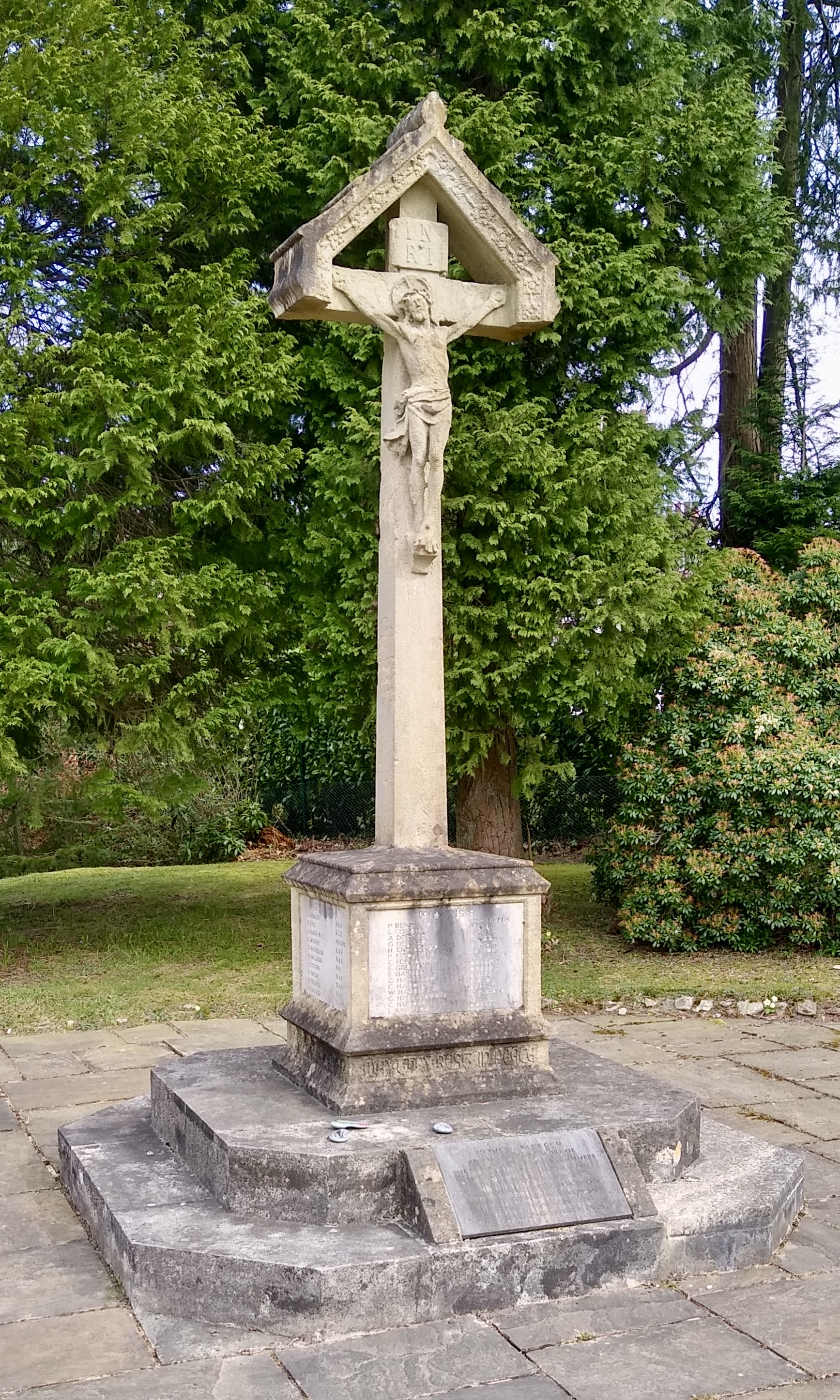
Beacon Hill War Memorial, Haslemere, Surrey

Bent's officer's sword is displayed in All Saints' Cathedral in his hometown of Halifax. His name is on the War Memorial outside St Alban's Church, Beacon Hill, Hindhead, Surrey. In 2015 a new road in Ashby-de-la-Zouch was named "Philip Bent Road"; this is located approximately 0.6 miles west of the town centre off Moira Road (B5006).

In 2016, Ashby School proposed to auction the medals won by Bent that had been donated to the school by his mother "to inspire future pupils". The medals had been on long-term loan to the Royal Leicestershire Regimental Museum (now part of Newarke Houses Museum in Leicester) since 1972, but had not been on display there for over forty years; it is understood that the medals were held in a safe deposit box at a Leicester bank. In May 2016 the school was unable to prove ownership.

The school planned to use the proceeds of selling Bent's medals to fund the building of a sports pavilion. In 2018, the school received funding from the National Healthy Schools Programme for a new pavilion.

== See also ==
- Military history of Nova Scotia

== Bibliography ==
- Snelling, Stephen (2012) [1998]. Passchendaele 1917. VCs of the First World War. The History Press. ISBN 978-0752476667.
