= English, Texas =

English, Texas may refer to places in the United States:

- English, Brazoria County, Texas
- English, Fannin County, Texas
- English, Red River County, Texas

== See also ==
- Texan English
