= English law (disambiguation) =

English Law, English Bill, English Act, or variation, may refer to:

- Law of the United Kingdom
- English law, the law of England and Wales
- Common law, the body of laws descended from England
- Legal English, the specialized English used in courts of law and legal writing
- English Bill (1858), a bill proposed by William Hayden English in the United States Congress
- English Language Unity Act, the bill introduced to define English as the official language of the United States
- Charter of the French Language (Bill 101), the act of law banning and proscribing uses of English in Quebec
- Pleading in English Act 1362, the law of England making English instead of courtly French the language of the courts of England
- The secular laws of jurisdictions in which Amish communities exist ("English" being the non-Amish), see Amish life in the modern world

== See also ==
- Lawrence English (born 1976) Australian composer
- Bill English (born 1961) New Zealand Prime Minister
- William English (disambiguation) for others 'Bill English'
- English (disambiguation)
