= English =

English usually refers to:

- English language
- English people

English may also refer to:

== Culture, language and peoples ==
- English, an adjective for something of, from, or related to England
- English, an Amish term for non-Amish, regardless of ethnicity
- English studies, the study of English language and literature

== Media ==
- English (2013 film), a Malayalam-language film
- English (novel), a Chinese book by Wang Gang
  - English (2018 film), a Chinese adaptation
- The English (TV series), a 2022 Western-genre miniseries
- English (play), 2022, by Sanaz Toossi

== People and fictional characters ==
- English (surname), a list of people and fictional characters
- English Fisher (1928–2011), American boxing coach
- English Gardner (born 1992), American track and field sprinter
- English McConnell (1882–1928), Irish footballer
- Aiden English, a ring name of Matthew Rehwoldt (born 1987), American former professional wrestler
- Ben English, stage name of Derek Hay (born 1964), British porn actor

== Places in the United States ==
- English, Indiana
- English, Kentucky
- English, Brazoria County, Texas
- English, Red River County, Texas
- English, West Virginia

== Sport ==
- English (cue sports term), side spin on the cue ball
- The English Defence, a chess opening

== See also ==
- Englisch, a surname
- Engrish
