= Thomas English =

Thomas, Tom or Tommy English may refer to:

- Thomas Crisp English (1878–1949), British surgeon
- Thomas Dunn English (1819–1902), American Democratic Party politician, author and songwriter from New Jersey
- Thomas English (mayor) (1820–1884), South Australian architect, politician and mayor of Adelaide, 1862–1863
- Thomas English (Medal of Honor) (c. 1819–1868), American Civil War sailor
- Thomas Mylius Savage English (1868–1949), British naturalist
- Tom English, drummer with the English band Maxïmo Park
- Tom English (footballer, born 1983), English former footballer
- Tom English (rugby union) (born 1991), Australian former rugby union player
- Tommy English (footballer) (born 1961), English former footballer
  - Tom English (footballer, born 1981), English former footballer, his son
- Tommy English (loyalist) (1960–2000), Northern Irish paramilitary and politician
- Tommy English (producer) (born 1986), American producer and songwriter

== See also ==
- Thomas Ingles (also known as Thomas English; 1751–1809), American frontiersman, pioneer and soldier
