= Ray E. Eubanks =

U.S Soldier

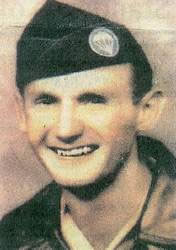
- Ray Eubanks
- Born: February 6, 1922; Snow Hill, North Carolina, U.S.
- Died: July 23, 1944 (aged 22); Noemfoor, Dutch New Guinea †
- Burial place: Westview Cemetery, Kinston, North Carolina
- Military career
- Allegiance: United States
- Branch: United States Army
- Service years: 1942 - 1944
- Rank: Sergeant
- Unit: 503rd Parachute Infantry Regiment
- Conflicts: World War II: Western New Guinea campaign; Battle of Noemfoor
- Awards: Medal of Honor

Ray E. Eubanks (February 6, 1922 – July 23, 1944) was a United States Army soldier and a recipient of the United States military's highest decoration — the Medal of Honor — for his actions in World War II.

== Biography ==
Eubanks joined the Army from La Grange, North Carolina in 1942, and by July 23, 1944, was serving as a Sergeant in Company D, 503rd Parachute Infantry Regiment. On that day, on the island of Noemfoor in Dutch New Guinea, Sgt. Eubanks single-handedly assaulted an enemy position with a Browning Automatic Rifle (BAR). Although he was wounded and his BAR disabled during his approach, he nevertheless charged the position, using his gun as a club to kill several Japanese soldiers until he was himself killed. For these actions, he was posthumously awarded the Medal of Honor eight months later, on March 29, 1945.

Eubanks, aged 22 at his death, was buried in Westview Cemetery, Kinston, North Carolina.

== Medal of Honor citation ==
Sergeant Eubanks' official Medal of Honor citation reads:

For conspicuous gallantry and intrepidity at the risk of his life above and beyond the call of duty at Noemfoor Island, Dutch New Guinea, 23 July 1944. While moving to the relief of a platoon isolated by the enemy, his company encountered a strong enemy position supported by machinegun, rifle, and mortar fire. Sgt. Eubanks was ordered to make an attack with 1 squad to neutralize the enemy by fire in order to assist the advance of his company. He maneuvered his squad to within 30 yards of the enemy where heavy fire checked his advance. Directing his men to maintain their fire, he and 2 scouts worked their way forward up a shallow depression to within 25 yards of the enemy. Directing the scouts to remain in place, Sgt. Eubanks armed himself with an automatic rifle and worked himself forward over terrain swept by intense fire to within 15 yards of the enemy position when he opened fire with telling effect. The enemy, having located his position, concentrated their fire with the result that he was wounded and a bullet rendered his rifle useless. In spite of his painful wounds he immediately charged the enemy and using his weapon as a club killed 4 of the enemy before he was himself again hit and killed. Sgt. Eubanks' heroic action, courage, and example in leadership so inspired his men that their advance was successful. They killed 45 of the enemy and drove the remainder from the position, thus effecting the relief of our beleaguered troops.

== See also ==
- List of Medal of Honor recipients
- List of Medal of Honor recipients for World War II
