= John English =

John English may refer to:

- John A. English (born 1940), Canadian academic and soldier
- John English (Australian politician) (born 1962), Australian politician
- John English (Canadian politician) (born 1945), Canadian historian and politician
- John English (film director) (1903–1969), British-American film director
- John English (ice hockey) (born 1966), Canadian former NHL player
- John English (theatre director) (1911–1998), English theatre director
- John F. English (1889–1969), American labor union official
- John Hawker English (1788–1840), English surgeon
- John W. English (1831–1916), Justice of the Supreme Court of Appeals of West Virginia
- Jon English (1949–2016), Australian singer and actor
- Jonathan English (director), English film director and producer

== See also ==
- Ivan Vedar (also known as Johny English; 1827–1898); Bulgarian Freemason and revolutionary
- Johnny English (film series), a British series of spy comedy films
  - Johnny English, 2003 British comedy film
  - Johnny English Reborn, the 2011 sequel
  - Johnny English Strikes Again, the 2018 sequel
- John English Junior Middle School, Ontario, Canada
- Jack English (disambiguation)
