= Englisch =

Englisch or Englissh is a surname, a variant of English. Notable persons with that name include:

- Andreas Englisch (born 1963), German journalist
- Berthold Englisch (1851–1897), Austrian chess master
- Lucie Englisch (1902–1965), Austrian actress
- Mighell Englissh, Master of the Mercers' Company in 1520 and 1527

It is also the German word for the English language.

== See also ==
- English (surname)
- English
- English language
