= James Hunt (judge) =

English barrister and a judge

Sir Patrick James Hunt (26 January 1943 – 8 November 2006) was an English barrister and a judge of the High Court of England and Wales.

== Biography ==
Hunt was born in Coalville in Leicestershire, where his father was a solicitor. He was educated at the Boys' Grammar School in Ashby de la Zouch, and read modern history at Keble College, Oxford. Studies came easily to him so he spent his energies on extracurricular activities, such as the tradition of spectacular Keble balls and training the Keble crew.

After graduating from Oxford, he joined Boots but decided that management was not for him and that he would read for the bar. He became a housemaster at his alma mater for a year while studying for the bar exams, teaching English and bringing the C stream of English into competition with the A stream, as well as controlling rowdy audience members of his Shakespeare productions by pelting them with mint imperials. He also sang with the local Gilbert & Sullivan pursuing a love of music and singing that continued throughout his life with both choral societies and jazz bands. He was called to the bar at Gray's Inn in 1968 and joined the Chambers at 1 King's Bench Walk after serving a pupillage there with David Smout. He practised mainly in criminal law on the Midland and Oxford Circuit, with a side line in personal injury. He was most well known for his ability to connect with a jury and see to the crux of a matter. He served as defence counsel in the Matrix Churchill case in 1992, and in the murder trial of Beverley Allitt in 1993 after which families of the victims praised his sensitive conduct of a powerful defence. He was prosecution counsel in the trial of groom Clem O'Brien for the murder of racehorse trainer Alex Scott in 1995. Such was his appeal to a jury that the police famously sought a change in the law in order to be able to appoint him to a case on the name of a victim rather than a defendant in order to ensure that he would not be against them.

He became head of chambers at 36 Bedford Row from 1991 to 1999, and became a bencher at Gray's Inn. He became a Queen's Counsel in 1987, was a member of the General Council of the Bar from 1989 to 1991 and 1996 to 1999, and Leader of the Midland and Oxford Circuit from 1996 to 1999.

He sat as a Recorder from 1982 to 2000, and as a Deputy High Court judge from 1994 to 2000. He was a member of the General Council of the Bar 1989 - 1991 and 1996 - 1999 and Legal Assessor to the Royal College of Veterinary Surgeons from 1990 - 2000. In 1999 - 2000, he was Chairman of the Code of Practice Appeal Board of the Association of the British Pharmaceutical Industry. He was knighted when appointed a High Court judge in 2000, in the Queen's Bench Division. On 21 November 2000, he granted an injunction to Michael Douglas and Catherine Zeta-Jones to prevent publication of pictures of their wedding in Hello! magazine. Although the injunction was overturned by the Court of Appeal, his judgment was later upheld by the House of Lords and Douglas and Zeta-Jones won substantial damages. He sat on the "Donnygate" trial in 2002, in which two men were sent to prison for corruption at Doncaster Metropolitan Borough Council.

He believed passionately in the importance of an independent professional bar and spent a great deal of his personal time in training of junior barristers. In recognition of his work, Grays Inn annually awards The James Hunt prize for advocacy. He also believed in local justice and the James Hunt Library at Nottingham Trent University on the Midland & Oxford Circuit is named in his honour.

In 2002, he was diagnosed with a cancerous brain tumour which he approached with poetry, humour and great humanity. He is survived by his wife - his first and greatest love of his life - and their son and three daughters.
