= Alexander Henry Green =

English geologist (1832–1896)

Alexander Henry Green FRS (10 October 1832 – 19 August 1896) was an English geologist.

== Life ==
Green was born at Maidstone on 10 October 1832, was the eldest son of Thomas Sheldon Green, head-master of the Ashby Grammar School at Ashby-de-la-Zouch, who had married Miss Derington of Hinckley in Leicestershire. After passing through his father's school he went to Gonville and Caius College, Cambridge, where he was admitted pensioner on 25 June 1851, and graduated as sixth wrangler in 1855. Elected a fellow of his college in the same year, he proceeded M.A. in 1858, and resided until 1861.

He obtained an appointment on the Geological Survey of Great Britain in 1861. Here he worked at first on the Jurassic and cretaceous rocks of the midland counties, passing on from them to the carboniferous deposits of Derbyshire, Yorkshire, and the northern counties. In 1874 he left the survey to become professor of geology in the Yorkshire College at Leeds, and wrote a well-received manual of Physical Geology in 1876. He also undertook, in 1885, the duties of the chair of mathematics, and was for a time lecturer on geology at the school of military engineering, Chatham. In 1888 he was appointed to the professorship of geology at Oxford in succession to Sir Joseph Prestwich, and received from that university the honorary degree of M.A.

Green became a Fellow of the Geological Society in 1862, and received the Murchison Medal in 1892. In the latter year he was elected honorary fellow of Gonville and Caius College. In 1886, he was elected a Fellow of the Royal Society, and in 1890 was president of the section of geology at the Leeds meeting of the British Association. His strength in this science lay in field work and in certain departments of physical geology where his mathematical knowledge was especially helpful. As a teacher and writer he was remarkably clear. In addition to the duties of his chair he undertook much examining and consulting work; perhaps, indeed, excessive labour shortened his life, for he was most indefatigable and thorough in whatever he took in hand. In the summer of 1896, he had a paralytic stroke, and died on 19 August at his residence, Boars Hill, near Oxford.

== Family ==
He was twice married: in 1866 to Miss Mary Marsden, from the neighbourhood of Sheffield, who died in 1882; and in 1883 to Miss W. M. Armstrong, a native of Clifton, who survived him. One son and two daughters were the issue of the first marriage, and a son and a daughter of the second, all of whom survived their father.
