= Battle of Noemfoor =

World War II battle in Dutch New Guinea

Coordinates: 0.980°S 134.892°E

- Part of the Pacific War of World War II
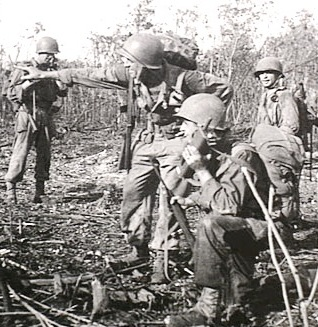
- Noemfoor, 12 July 1944. A U.S. soldier points out the direction in which Japanese troops have retreated, to a comrade using an SCR-536 "handie-talkie". (Photographer: Allan F. Anderson)
Date	2 July – 31 August 1944
Location	Dutch New Guinea
Result	Allied victory

Belligerents
United States; Australia; Netherlands	Japan

Commanders and leaders
(United States) Walter Krueger (United States) Edwin D. Patrick (land) (United States) Russell S. Berkey (naval) (Australia) Frederick Scherger (air)	(Empire of Japan) Suesada Shimizu

Strength
10,000	2,000 (US estimates)

Casualties and losses
66 killed/missing; 343 wounded	~1,730 killed; 186 prisoners

The Battle of Noemfoor was part of the New Guinea campaign of World War II. It took place on the island of Noemfoor, in Dutch New Guinea (now Papua, in Indonesia), between 2 July and 31 August 1944. During the battle, Allied forces landed on the island to capture Japanese bases as part of their advance through the Pacific towards the Philippines. The initial landing was largely unopposed and the Japanese defenders withdrew inland as the US troops came ashore. Sporadic fighting took place over the course of two months as the Allies secured the three airfields on the island and pushed the surviving Japanese troops to the southeastern coast. The island was later used by the Allies to support operations around Sansapor and on Morotai.

== Background ==
=== Geography and strategic situation ===
Noemfoor is an elliptical, almost circular shape. It is approximately 11 mi (18 km) in diameter and encircled by coral reefs. The landscape is dominated by limestone and coral terraces, topped by a 670 ft (200 m) tall hill, which is covered by tropical rainforest, like much of the interior. One of the Schouten Islands, Noemfoor lies at the western end of the Japen Strait, to the north of Cenderawasih Bay (Geelvink Bay), between the island of Biak and the east coast of the Doberai Peninsula (Vogelkop/Bird's Head Peninsula), on mainland New Guinea.

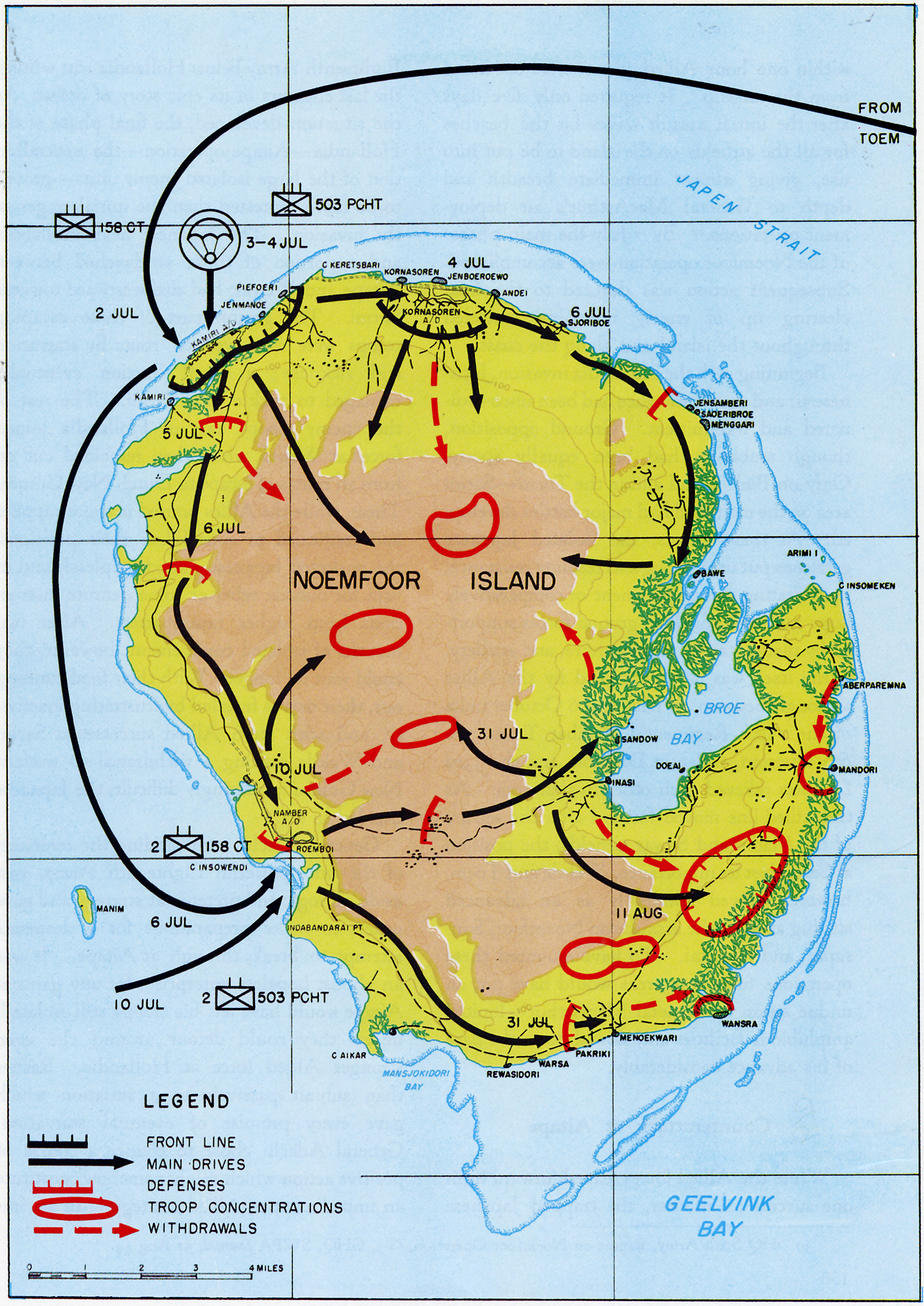
Map showing Japanese dispositions and the Allied assault plan

The island was occupied by Japanese forces in December 1943. The indigenous civilian population numbered about 5,000 people, most of whom lived a subsistence lifestyle in coastal villages. There were also 1,100 laborers on the island: a 600-strong Formosan (Taiwanese) auxiliary labor unit and 500 Indonesian civilian forced laborers. According to the official U.S. Army history, over 3,000 Indonesian men, women, and children were shipped to Noemfoor by the Japanese military. Most came from Soerabaja (Surabaya) and other large cities on Java. These Javanese civilians were forced to construct roads and airfields, mostly by hand. Little food, clothing, shelter or medical attention were provided. Many attempted to steal Japanese supplies, and were executed. Others died from starvation and preventable disease. Survivors also alleged that sick Javanese were buried alive.

The Formosan labor troops had originally numbered about 900 men. They had also worked on airfield and road construction, on half the ration of rice issued to regular Japanese troops. When they became ill from exhaustion, hunger, or tropical diseases, they were put in a convalescent camp. In the words of the U.S. official history: "There, their rations were again cut in half, and the shelter and blankets provided covered but a fraction of the inmates. Medical care was given only to the worse cases, and then was inadequate."

Throughout 1943–44, the Japanese built three airfields on the island, turning it into a significant air base. The three fields were: Kornasoren Airfield/Yebrurro Airfield, located toward the northern end of the island; Kamiri Airfield, on the northwestern edge of the island; and Namber Airfield, on the west coast of the island. Of these, Kornasoren was unfinished at the time of the battle. Noemfoor was also used as a staging area for Japanese troops moving to reinforce Biak, which was invaded by the Allies in May 1944 as part of their westward advance along the northern New Guinea coast. Japanese barges could travel from Manokwari to Noemfoor—about 60 nmi (69 mi; 110 km)—during one night.

=== Allied plans ===
By 20 June, Japanese forces on Biak had been largely defeated and construction work began on the Mokmer airfield, which was operational two days later. Bombing of the Noemfoor by the United States Army Air Forces (USAAF) and Royal Australian Air Force (RAAF) began as early as April 1944. Between 20 June and 1 July, Allied bombers dropped 800 tons of bombs on the island.

In describing his preparations for the Western New Guinea campaign, General Douglas MacArthur wrote in his memoirs that: "[t]he Hollandia Invasion initiated a marked change in the tempo of my advance westward. Subsequent assaults against Wakde, Biak, Noemfoor, and Sansapor were mounted in quick succession, and, in contrast to previous campaigns, I planned no attempt to complete all phases of one operation before moving on to the next objective."

At the time of the battle, the area's strategic importance lay in its proximity along planned Allied avenues of advance through the southwest Pacific and western New Guinea toward the Philippines. Specifically, Noemfoor was selected for invasion for four reasons:

- Allied commanders believed that Japanese troops equivalent to less than one battalion would be based there;
- the Allies were already experiencing a shortage of amphibious vessels and Noemfoor could be seized without large-scale operations;
- it also had the greatest number of useful airfields in the smallest area and;
- Japanese air defenses in western New Guinea were almost negligible.

At the end of June, RAAF HQ reported that although the Namber and Kamiri airfields were serviceable, they were barely being used and "a possibly generous" estimate suggested that only 19 Japanese bombers and 37 fighters remained in New Guinea.

== Opposing forces ==
For the assault on Noemfoor, known as Operation Cyclone, MacArthur selected a ground and air task force numbering 10,000, known as Cyclone Task Force. About 5,500 of these were support and service personnel, including 3,000 assigned to the rapid upgrading of Japanese airfields, as well as construction of new air fields, following the capture of the island.

As the main assault force, MacArthur selected the 158th Regimental Combat Team. This formation consisted primarily of units from the Arizona National Guard, United States Army, and was commanded by Major General Edwin D. Patrick. The 158th formed part of General Walter Krueger's Sixth Army (Alamo Force). At the time of its assignment to the operation, the 158th RCT was engaged in fighting around Wakde. To free it up for the assault, in mid-June, Kruger decided to replace the 158th at Wakde with the US 6th Infantry Division.

In mid-June, No. 10 Operational Group (10 OG), Royal Australian Air Force, under Air Commodore Frederick Scherger, was designated the controlling Allied air force unit for Operation Cyclone. USAAF units attached to 10 OG for the invasion comprised: the 58th and 348th Fighter Groups and the 307th, 309th and 417th Bombardment Groups. No. 62 Wing RAAF, a non-flying construction unit landed with the US ground forces and was tasked with airfield improvement works.

A 39-strong contingent of Dutch civil administration personnel that was included to re-establish Dutch civil administration. This force was later reinforced by 10 local police officers after the landing.

Facing them were approximately 2,000 Japanese troops, mostly from the 219th Infantry Regiment (35th Division) as well as some from the 222nd Infantry Regiment, who had been in transit to Biak. The garrison was commanded by Colonel Suesada Shimizu, who was also the commander of the 219th Infantry Regiment. Shimizu had arrived on the island on 8 June and had organized his defending troops into fourteen strongpoints; ultimately these were too widely dispersed to enable a coherent defense. Other units assigned to the Japanese garrison included the 8th Independent Battalion (Provisional), several airfield construction units, a motor transport company, an antiaircraft unit and elements of an airfield company and airfield battalion. Throughout 1944, various kinds of Japanese aircraft were at the Noemfoor airfields. Elements of 61° Hiko Sentai ("No. 61 Air Group"/"61st Flying Regiment"), flying Mitsubishi Ki-21 ("Sally") bombers, were based at Kamiri. However, Japanese aircraft played no significant role in the ensuing battle as the 23rd Air Flotilla was redeployed to resist US forces around Saipan on 13 June.

== Invasion ==
The landing force mounted at Finschhafen and Toem, in late June, and sailed to the objective in three groups after orders had been drawn up and rehearsals had been undertaken. From 04:30 on 2 July, warships from the U.S.-Australian Task Forces 74 and 75—under Rear Admiral Russell S. Berkey—bombarded Japanese positions on Noemfoor. TF 74 was commanded for the first time by Commodore John Collins, making him the first graduate of the Royal Australian Naval College to command a naval squadron in action. In response to the bombardment, Japanese antiaircraft guns briefly fired upon spotting aircraft until being knocked out by naval gunfire from Allied ships.

At 08:00 on 2 July, the 158th RCT was taken to the beach by TF 77, made up of LCMs and LCTs under Rear Admiral William Fechteler. The initial landings were near Kamiri airfield, on the northwest edge of the island. The island was surrounded by "an almost solid ring" of coral, but this did not hinder the landing and American newspapers later reported "almost no loss" of troops before reaching the shore. Shimizu's force had largely retired inland before the US landing. The initial landing was carried by two battalions, which landed abreast of each other, securing a beachhead about half a mile wide, supported by LVTs crewed by personnel from the 3rd Engineer Special Brigade.

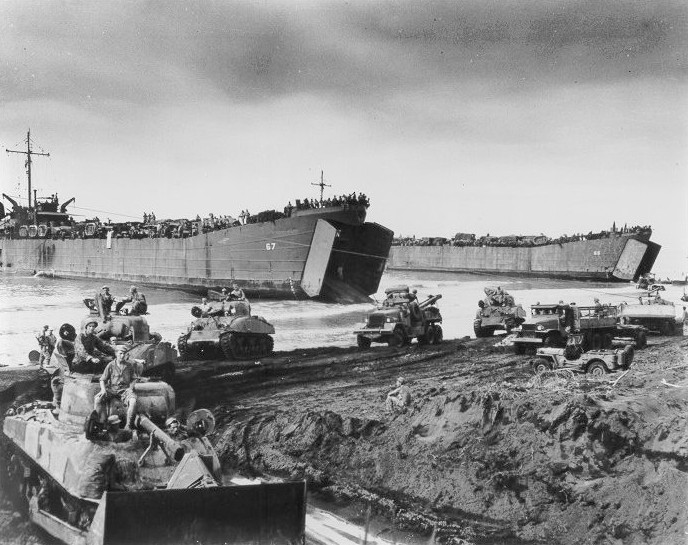
U.S. Army M4 Sherman tanks and other vehicles disembarking from LSTs onto Noemfoor

There had been extensive Japanese defensive preparations in the Kamiri area including wire entanglements, trenches, dugouts and prepared positions covering the Allied avenues of advance, but there was little resistance at Kamiri Airfield and the area was quickly secured as the assaulting infantry cleared the area. About 300 improvised land mines had been placed by the Japanese around the beach, but these were clearly marked and were dealt with quickly. A group of about 40 Japanese were killed around some of the caves in the area, but the majority of Japanese troops had withdrawn inland, as part of Shimizu's plan to move east towards Broe Bay to wait for evacuation; as a consequence the only opposition to the landing was an hour-long artillery bombardment from an inland battery, which fell on the landing beach and reef. One Allied soldier was killed in the bombardment, and two vehicles were destroyed before the battery was suppressed by naval guns.

In the words of the U.S. Navy official history: "Japanese encountered around the airfield were so stunned from the effects of the bombardment that all the fight was taken out of them." Kamiri was captured within hours of the landing. Reports indicated that approximately 45 Japanese soldiers were killed, and about 30 Japanese planes captured, although all of these were damaged as a result of the earlier bombardment and bombing. By 1750 hours on the first day, 7,100 troops had been landed, along with 500 vehicles and 2,250 tons of supplies, which had been unloaded from the eight assigned LSTs.

The following day, 3 July, as a precaution against Japanese resistance elsewhere, the 2,000 paratroopers of the U.S. 503rd Parachute Infantry Regiment began dropping onto the island. The regiment's 1st Battalion arrived first, suffering 72 non battle casualties as several sticks were dropped from low altitude, resulting in a large number of leg fractures. The 3rd Battalion followed the next day, incurring another 56 non battle casualties in the drop. As a result of the large numbers of injuries, the 2nd Battalion was brought ashore in LCIs instead of being dropped by air.

The second base captured by US forces, Yebrurro airstrip, was secured by 4 July and the Allied beachhead was expanded towards Kamiri. That same day, the first elements of No. 10 Operational Group arrived on Noemfoor. There were no Japanese air attacks until the night of 4 July, when a light bomber dropped three bombs near Kamiri, without effect. A few days later, four single-engined fighters dropped about 40 incendiary bombs, causing some damage to Allied materiel.

Early on 5 July, there was an unsuccessful counter-attack by Japanese ground forces at Kamiri, around Hill 201, although it was defeated by 0630 hours. Around 200 Japanese were killed during the assault, which was carried out by two companies from the 219th Infantry Regiment and around 150 Formosan laborers. For the remainder of the day, US forces carried out mopping up operations and sent out patrols towards the northeast. The following day, a detachment of U.S. forces from Noemfoor also secured the smaller neighboring island of Manim. The 2nd Battalion, 158th Infantry Regiment embarked upon 20 LCTs and sailed down the western coast to capture Namber Airfield which came under Allied control, without resistance, on 6 July. The island was officially declared secure on 7 July. However, individual Japanese soldiers continued guerrilla activities, albeit largely limited to night time raids. While this was taking place, the Dutch detachment were able to establish contact with local chiefs who assisted in mopping up operations against the Japanese from late July.

Following this the Japanese withdrew further inland. Despite Shimizu's plans to withdraw to Broe Bay to await evacuation, the majority of his troops melted into the hills and the evacuation never eventuated. Small groups attempted to resist and Shimizu's small force was slowly pushed towards the southeastern part of the island. Troops from the 503rd Parachute Infantry dispatched many patrols to pursue the withdrawing Japanese. Initially, a force of about 400–500 Japanese troops under Shimizu broke contact and gathered at Hill 670, several miles to the northeast of the airfield. The 1st Battalion, 503rd Parachute Infantry Regiment reestablished contact on 13 July and over the course of three days pushed towards the crest of the hill, which was found abandoned on 16 July.

After withdrawing from Hill 670, Shimizu's force then managed to evade the US patrols until 23 July. About 4 miles (6.4 km) northwest of Inasi, troops from the 2nd Battalion, 503rd Parachute Infantry Regiment clashed with the Japanese near the lagoon. For his actions during this engagement, Sergeant Ray E. Eubanks was later posthumously awarded the Medal of Honor. Contact between the two forces was lost from 25 July until 10 August, when a week long action took place around Hill 380. Despite US artillery and air strikes, the Japanese commander managed to slip through the US cordon with a small force and withdrew towards Pakriki, on the coast. Sporadic fighting continued throughout the rest of the month, but by 31 August all fighting had ceased.

== Aftermath ==
=== Casualties ===
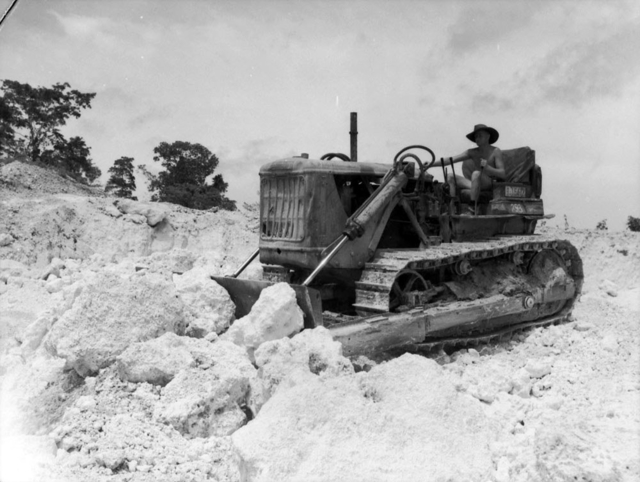
Australian airfield construction personnel at Noemfoor

By 31 August, Cyclone Task Force had lost 66 killed or missing and 343 wounded. It had killed approximately 1,730 Japanese and taken 186 prisoners. According to the U.S. Army official history, only 403 of the original 3,000 Javanese civilian laborers were alive by 31 August. About 10–15 were reported to have been killed accidentally by Allied forces. The rest had died from mistreatment before the invasion.

About 300 Formosan labor troops had died before the invasion. Others fought the Allies, allegedly as a result of Japanese coercion. Over 550 surrendered; more than half of these were suffering from starvation and tropical diseases. Less than 20 were reported killed by Allied action. According to the U.S. Army historian, Robert Ross Smith, Allied personnel found evidence that human bodies, of Japanese, Formosan and Allied personnel, had been partly eaten by starving Japanese and Formosans.

=== Base development ===
Allied airfield repair and construction work by the RAAF and U.S. Army Engineers began on 2 July. On the afternoon of 6 July, before the formal cessation of hostilities on the ground, an RAAF P-40 fighter squadron had landed at Kamiri, supporting operations on Noemfoor and becoming the first of many Allied air force units to be based there.

Namber Airfield was assessed as too rough and badly graded to be effectively used by Allied aircraft. It was abandoned in favor of expansion and improvements at Kornasoren. On 25 July, a USAAF P-38 Lighting fighter group was able to land there. By 2 September, two parallel 7,000 ft (2,100 m) runways had been completed; soon afterwards, B-24 Liberator heavy bombers began operating from Kornasoren Airfield, against Japanese petroleum facilities at Balikpapan, Borneo. Allied aircraft based on Noemfoor played an important role in the battles of Sansapor and Morotai.
