= Jack English =

Jack English may refer to:

- Jack English (footballer, born 1886) (1886–1953), English footballer and manager
- Jack English (footballer, born 1923) (1923–1985), his son, football forward
- Jack English (photographer) (born 1948), English photographer

== See also ==
- Jack Hightower (1926–2013, middle name English), U.S. representative
- John English (disambiguation)
