= William English =

Bill English (born 1961) was the 39th Prime Minister of New Zealand.

William English or Bill English may also refer to:

- William English, alternative name of William Grisaunt (fl. 1350), English physician
- William English (poet) (died 1778), Irish poet
- William F. English (1934–2021), American politician
- William Hayden English (1822–1896), American politician
  - William E. English (1850–1926), U.S. Representative from Indiana, son of William Hayden English
- William John English (1882–1941), Irish recipient of the Victoria Cross
- Bill English (actor), American actor
- Bill English (musician) (1925–2007), American jazz drummer
- Bill English (computer engineer) (1929–2020), contributor to the development of the computer mouse

== See also ==
- English law (disambiguation)
- William Kirwan (born 1938, middle name English), chancellor of USM
- William English Walling (1877–1936), American labor reformer and socialist
