= Nora David, Baroness David =

British politician and life peer

The Right Honourable The Baroness David

Member of the House of Lords
- Lord Temporal
- Life peerage 28 April 1978 – 29 November 2009

Personal details
- Born: 23 September 1913
- Died: 29 November 2009 (aged 96)

Nora Ratcliff David, Baroness David (née Blakesley; 23 September 1913 – 29 November 2009) was a British Labour Party politician and life peer.

Born Nora Ratcliff Blakesley, the daughter of a merchant, she was educated at Ashby-de-la-Zouch Girls' Grammar School and at Saint Felix School, Southwold before going up to Newnham College, Cambridge to study English graduating in 1935. In the same year, she married Richard William David (died 1993) with whom she had two sons and two daughters.

She was a Councillor in the city of Cambridge from 1964 to 1967, and from 1968 to 1974, when she became a County Councillor in Cambridgeshire County Council. She was a Justice of the Peace in Cambridge from 1965 until her death.

She was raised to the life peerage as Baroness David, of Romsey in the City of Cambridge, on 28 April 1978. She was an opposition spokesperson on education from 1979 until 1985 and again from 1987 to 1997, and for the environment (1985–1987). She was also a government and opposition whip from 1978 to 1987. Her political interests included education, the environment, home affairs, and children. She was a fellow of Newnham College, Cambridge.

Baroness David was an active member of the House of Lords. On Wednesday 31 January 2007, she slipped and fell down an escalator on the Parliamentary Estate, and was subsequently rushed to hospital. Shortly after the fall she retired to Cornwall. She died on 29 November 2009, aged 96, and was survived by two sons and two daughters.
