= 503rd Infantry Regiment =

Airborne infantry regiment of the United States Army

503rd Parachute Infantry Regiment 503rd Airborne Infantry Regiment 503rd Infantry Regiment
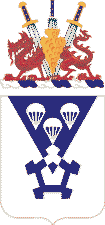
- Coat of arms
- Active: 1941–1945; 1951–1984; 1986–present
- Country: United States
- Branch: United States Army
- Type: Airborne forces
- Role: Parachute infantry
- Size: Regiment
- Nickname: The Rock
- Engagements: World War II; Vietnam War; Afghanistan; Operation Iraqi Freedom
- Decorations: Presidential Unit Citation

Commanders
- Notable commanders: George M. Jones

Insignia
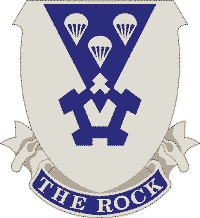
- Distinctive unit insignia

- Unit flash of 1st Battalion

- Unit flash of 2nd Battalion

The 503rd Infantry Regiment, formerly the 503rd Parachute Infantry Regiment (503rd PIR) and the 503rd Airborne Infantry Regiment (503rd AIR), is an airborne infantry regiment of the United States Army. The regiment served as an independent regiment in the Pacific War during World War II; at Fort Campbell, Kentucky; in Okinawa, Japan; and in Germany. Regimental elements have been assigned to the 2nd Infantry Division, the 11th Airborne Division, the 24th Infantry Division, the 25th Infantry Division, the 82nd Airborne Division, the 101st Airborne Division, and the 173rd Airborne Brigade Combat Team. Regimental elements have participated in campaigns in the Vietnam War, Operation Enduring Freedom–Afghanistan, and Operation Iraqi Freedom. The regiment claims 15 Medal of Honor recipients: two from World War II, ten from Vietnam, and three from Afghanistan. A parent regiment under the U.S. Army Regimental System. The regiment's 1st and 2nd Battalions are active, assigned to the 173rd Airborne Brigade, based at Caserma Ederle, Vicenza, Italy. The 3rd and 4th Battalions as well as Companies E, F, G, H, and I have been inactivated.

== Current status of regimental elements ==
- 1st Battalion, 503rd Infantry Regiment (1-503rd IR): Active, assigned to the 173rd Airborne Brigade, based in Vicenza, Italy
- 2nd Battalion, 503rd Infantry Regiment (2-503rd IR): Active, assigned to the 173rd Airborne Brigade, based in Vicenza, Italy
- 3rd Battalion, 503rd Infantry Regiment (3-503rd IR): Inactive since 1973
- 4th Battalion, 503rd Infantry Regiment (4-503rd IR): Inactive since 1973
- Company E, 503rd Infantry Regiment (E-503rd IR): Inactive since 1957
- Company F, 503rd Infantry Regiment (F-503rd IR): Inactive since 1957
- Company G, 503rd Infantry Regiment (G-503rd IR): Inactive since 1957
- Company H, 503rd Infantry Regiment (H-503rd IR): Inactive since 1957
- Company I, 503rd Infantry Regiment (I-503rd IR): Inactive since 1957

== History ==
=== World War II ===
On 14 February 1942, just two months after the American entry into World War II, the 503rd Parachute Infantry Regiment was formed, under the command of Lieutenant Colonel William M. "Bud" Miley. The regiment's 1st and 2nd Battalions were formed at Fort Benning, Georgia, from the 503rd and 504th Parachute Battalions, respectively. In May 1942, the 503rd's 2nd Battalion was detached and sailed to Scotland, where it trained and would later take part in the Allied invasion of German-occupied North Africa in November 1942. This unit was later redesignated the 2nd Battalion, 509th Parachute Infantry. It would ultimately be the only battalion in its regiment, that existed in name only with no active regimental headquarters, and would later be redesignated the 509th Parachute Infantry Battalion in 1944.

The 3rd Battalion, 503rd Parachute Infantry was activated on 8 June 1942 at Fort Bragg, North Carolina, formed by elements of the 502nd Parachute Infantry; the Headquarters and Headquarters Company, 1st Battalion, 502nd, became Headquarters and Headquarters Company, 3rd Battalion, 503rd; Company A became Company G; Company B became Company H, and Company C became Company I. The regiment departed the United States in mid-October 1942 for Australia augmented by Company A, 504th Parachute Infantry, which had personally been selected by Major General Matthew Ridgway, the commander of the 82nd Airborne Division, as his best rifle company. Docking in the Panama Canal Zone on 1 November, the 503rd picked up the 501st Parachute Infantry Battalion (minus Company C), which had been undergoing jungle training. The 501st, as well as Company A, 504th, was redesignated as the 503rd's 2nd Battalion: Company A, 501st became Company E, 503rd; Company B, 501st became Company F, 503rd; and Company A, 504th became Company D, 503rd. In late 1942 and early 1943, there was confusion about unit designations in the 503rd, as some officers interpreted the 503rd was operating with two 2nd Battalions, one in Australia and one in Great Britain/North Africa. Unlike many other airborne units, which were deployed in the European Theater of Operations (ETO), the 503rd was the first airborne regiment to fight in the Pacific, and as an independent unit.

On 2 November 1942, the former 501st Parachute Battalion was inactivated on paper so that a new regiment (the 501st Parachute Infantry Regiment) with a lineal connection to its parent parachute battalion could be activated at Fort Benning.

The 503rd's first operation was an unopposed landing at Nadzab, in the Markham Valley, New Guinea, on 5 September 1943. Although the landings were unopposed, the troops were later attacked by enemy bombers from the air. The 503rd's deployment helped force the Japanese evacuation of a major military outpost at Lae. During their overland withdrawal, the third battalion of the 503rd had a major skirmish with the Japanese rear guard.

On 3–4 July 1944, 1st and 3rd Battalions of the 503rd were delivered by parachute to Kamiri Airfield on the island of Noemfoor off the coast of Dutch New Guinea, sustaining significant casualties from the jump. To reduce further casualties, the 2nd Battalion was delivered amphibiously. At the Battle of Noemfoor, the 503rd played a major role in the elimination of the Japanese garrison on that island. As a result of his heroic actions during the battle, paratrooper Sergeant Ray E. Eubanks was posthumously awarded the Medal of Honor. Airfields constructed on Noemfoor after its capture enabled the advance of Allied troops from New Guinea to the Philippines.

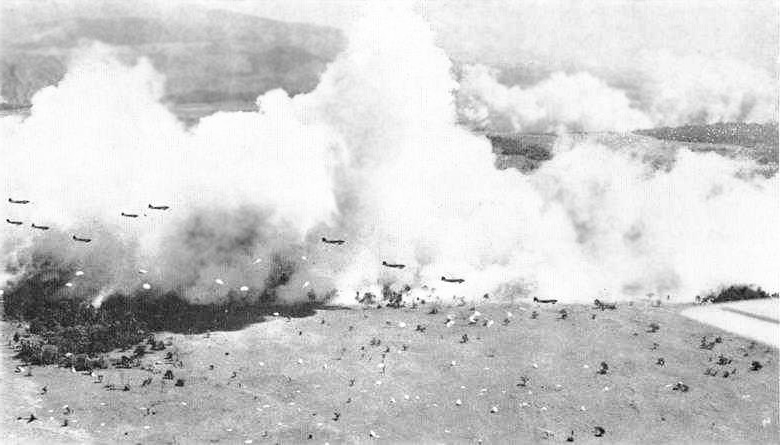
Dwarfed by and silhouetted against clouds of smoke (created to provide concealment), C-47s from the USAAF drop a battalion of the 503rd at Nadzab, New Guinea. A battalion dropped moments earlier is landing in the foreground.

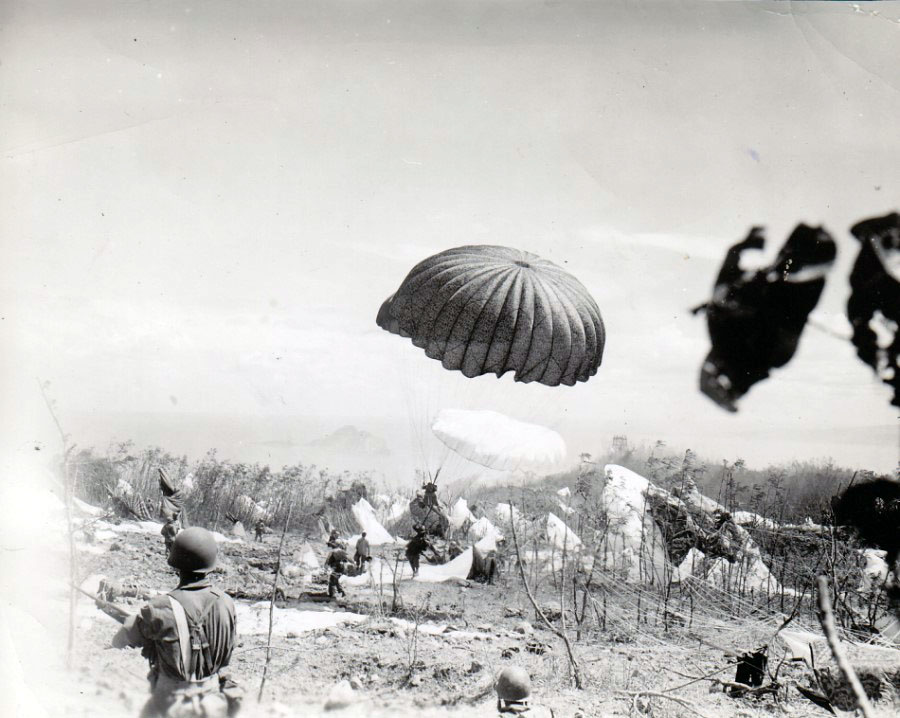
Paratroopers of the 503rd PRCT descend on Corregidor, 16 February 1945.

Following a non-combat landing on the island of Leyte in the Philippines, the 503rd Regimental Combat Team (RCT) made a major amphibious landing on Mindoro Island in the central Philippines on 15 December 1944. Originally, it was intended for the 503rd to jump on Mindoro, but due to inadequate airstrip facilities on Leyte, an airborne landing was not possible. During the Battle of Mindoro, the 503rd was subjected to intense air and naval actions, at one point being shelled for 25 minutes by a Japanese naval task force. One company of the 503rd RCT engaged in a fierce battle against a company-size Japanese force defending an enemy air raid warning station on the north end of the island. The success of the Mindoro operation enabled the United States Army Air Forces to construct and operate air strips and forward air bases to support later landings in the Philippines at Lingayen Gulf, Luzon. During combat in the Philippines, Lieutenant Colonel Joe S. Lawrie, former regimental S-3 and executive officer, and former 1st Battalion commander, succeeded to regimental command.

On 16 February 1945, the 503rd RCT jumped on Fortress Corregidor ("the Rock") to liberate that island from occupying Japanese forces. Braving intense fire, the paratroopers rushed forward and overcame the heavy blockhouse defenses, dropping explosives into embrasures to kill hidden Japanese gunners. For its successful capture of Corregidor, the unit was awarded a Presidential Unit Citation and received its nickname, "the Rock Regiment" from it. The regimental insignia was designed by Private First Class Thomas M. McNeill while recuperating from his injuries and dengue fever, hepatitis, and malaria on Mindoro Island, following the battle of Corregidor.

After returning to Mindoro, the 503rd was alerted for another combat jump, this time in the central Philippines to reinforce the 40th Infantry Division in its fight on Negros island. However, the jump was canceled and the combat team landed amphibiously on 7 April 1945. It would spend the remainder of the war conducting mopping up operations on the island, often against fanatical enemy resistance; notably, one of the Japanese units the 503rd fought was the remnants of the battered 2nd Raiding Brigade of Japanese paratroopers. After Japan's surrender in August 1945, over 6,150 Japanese soldiers surrendered to the 503rd, although some continued to hold out until October.

=== Post-WWII history ===
Inactivated at Camp Anza, California, in December 1945, it was reactivated and redesignated as the 503rd Airborne Infantry Regiment in February 1951 and assigned to the 11th Airborne Division at Fort Campbell, Kentucky, following the departure of the 187th Airborne Infantry Regiment to Korea as a separate airborne regimental combat team. In 1956 the 503rd went with the rest of the 11th Airborne Division to posts in southeastern Germany.

The 503rd was relieved on 1 March 1957 from assignment to the 11th Airborne Division and was concurrently reorganized and redesignated as the 503rd Infantry, a parent regiment under the Combat Arms Regimental System. This year marked the point during which infantry regimental numbers ceased indicating actual tactical units but instead were used in designating battle groups of Pentomic divisions, which did not have regiments and battalions.

On 1 July 1958 the 11th Airborne Division was inactivated and its personnel and equipment reflagged as the 24th Infantry Division; however, two of the division's five battle groups remained on jump status with Airborne designations: the 1st Airborne Battle Group, 187th Infantry, and the 1st Airborne Battle Group, 503d Infantry. This was a short-term assignment, however, and on 7 January 1959 1-503d was relieved from assignment to the 24th Infantry Division and assigned to the 82d Airborne Division at Fort Bragg.

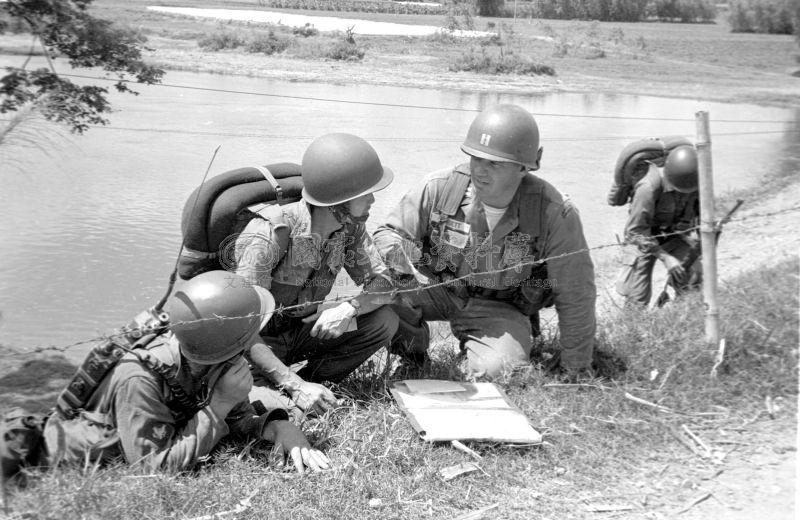
Tien Bing No. 1 exercise in Pingtung, Taiwan, 1960

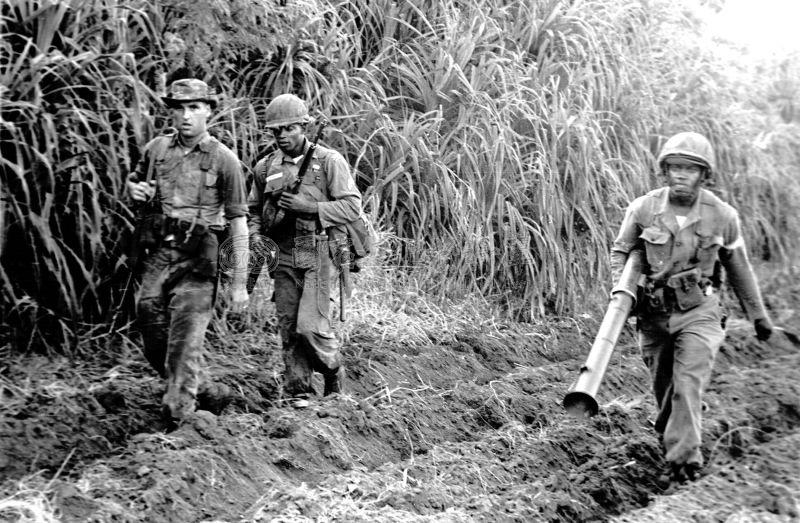
Tien Bing No. 1 exercise in Pingtung, Taiwan, 1960

The move was accompanied by the rotation of the only other airborne battle group, 1-187th, from the 24th to the 82nd. Concurrently 1-504th and 1-505th were relieved from the 82nd and assigned to the 8th Infantry Division in central Germany. At Fort Bragg, 1-503rd joined 2-503rd, already assigned to the 82nd, as one of the division's five battle groups.

On 24 June 1960 the 1st ABG, 503d Infantry was relieved from assignment to the 82d Airborne Division and assigned to the 25th Infantry Division in Hawaii, remaining there until 1 July 1961 when it was relieved from the division as it traveled to Okinawa. The ABG was accompanied by Battery C (Abn), 319th Artillery, later reorganized and redesignated as HHB, 3d Battalion (Abn), 319th Field Artillery. On 26 March 1963 it was assigned to the newly activated 173d Airborne Brigade, and shortly thereafter it was reorganized and redesignated as the 2d Battalion, 503d Infantry on 25 June 1963. Additionally, on 26 March 1963 the 1st ABG, 503d Infantry was relieved from assignment to the 82d Airborne Division, assigned to the 173d Airborne Brigade and subsequently reorganized and redesignated as a battalion as well.

== Further service by regimental elements ==
=== Vietnam War ===
In May 1965, two battalions of the 503rd Infantry deployed as part of the 173rd Airborne Brigade to Vietnam as the first major U.S. Army ground combat unit to be deployed, joined later by 4-503rd Inf and 3-503rd Inf (bearing the lineages of the former Company D and Company C, 503rd PIR, respectively). During its six years in Vietnam, the four battalions of the 503rd participated in fourteen campaigns, earning two more Presidential Unit Citations and a Meritorious Unit Commendation. The 2nd Bn (Abn), 503rd Inf participated in the only combat jump of the war during "Operation Junction City" in 1967. It redeployed to the U.S. in July 1971, having the distinction of being one of the last units to leave Vietnam.

Following the return of the 173rd Brigade (Separate) to the U.S. was its inactivation when its assets were used to form the 3rd Brigade (Airborne), 101st Airborne Division (Airmobile). The 1-503rd was relieved from the 173rd effective in August 1971. The 1-503rd was deactivated and 4-503rd was reassigned as 1-503rd 173rd Brigade Separate and on 14 January 1972 reassigned to 3rd Brigade, 101st Airborne Division (Airmobile). The 2-503rd continued as 2-503rd, 173rd Airborne Brigade (Separate)and on 14 January 1972 relieved and reassigned as 2-503rd 3rd Brigade, 101st Airborne Division (Airmobile). The 3-503rd was relieved and reactivated as 3rd-187th 173rd Airborne Brigade (Separate) and on 14 January 1972 reassigned to 3rd Brigade, 101st Airborne Division (Airmobile). The 3rd Brigade, along with other supporting division units, saw its jump status terminated on 1 April 1974 when the 101st became a completely airmobile division (renamed Air Assault on 4 October 1974).

The lineage of 2-503rd was inactivated on 1 October 1983 and relieved from assignment to the 101st, followed by 1-503rd on 16 November 1984. The existing battalions were reflagged as units of the 187th Infantry Regiment during the implementation of the U.S. Army Regimental System (ARS).

=== Reactivation in Korea, assignment to Italy ===
On 16 December 1986 both 1-503d and 2-503d were reactivated and assigned to the 2d Brigade, 2d Infantry Division in Korea when two existing infantry battalions were reflagged. Stationed together at Camp Hovey, they formed the division's 2d Brigade, which also included the 1st Battalion, 506th Infantry. Both battalions of the 503d performed annual rotations to Warrior Base, just south of the Korean Demilitarized Zone (DMZ), from where they patrolled the DMZ; manned guard posts Collier, Oullette, and 128; and served as a quick-reaction force for the DMZ.

The 2nd Bn, 503rd Inf was inactivated on 29 September 1990 in Korea and relieved from assignment to the 2nd Infantry Division, but 1-503rd and 1-506th remained and became air assault battalions within the division. (Although locally referred to as air assault battalions, they were never recognized as such by DA and were employed as regular infantry battalions.) The 2nd Bn, 503d returned to active status as an airborne battalion on 16 December 2001 when it was assigned to the 173rd Airborne Brigade and activated in Italy. The company names were kept from its lineage in Korea: A Company (Able), B Company (Battle), C Company (Chosen), D Company (Destined), H Company (Hound), HHC (Blacksheep).

=== Global war on terror ===
In March 2003, the Turkish government refused to allow American ground forces of the 4th Infantry Division (mechanized), which were positioned at their ports, to move through Turkey in order to establish a northern front in support of "Operation Iraqi Freedom". The stalled plan had involved moving more than 80,000 troops through Turkey. America needed another option and the paratroopers of the 173rd Airborne Brigade provided that option. On 26 March at 2000 hours, fifteen C-17 aircraft delivered 20 heavy platforms and 959 paratroopers of the 173rd Airborne Brigade onto Bashur Drop Zone in the vicinity of Bashur, Iraq. This combat parachute assault was the beginning of Operation Northern Delay and established the coalition's northern front.

The parachute assault force consisted of HHC, 173rd Airborne Brigade; 1st Battalion (Airborne), 508th Infantry Regiment commanded by Lt. Col. Harry Tunnell; 2nd Battalion (Airborne), 503rd Infantry Regiment commanded by Lt. Col. Dominic J. Caraccilo; 74th Infantry Detachment (Long Range Surveillance); D Battery (Airborne), 319th Field Artillery Regiment; 173rd Support Company (Combat); 501st Support Company (Forward), 250th Forward Surgical Team; ODA (-), 2nd Battalion, 10th Special Forces Group (Airborne); 4th Air Support Operations Group (USAFE); and the 86th Contingency Response Group (assigned to the 86th Airlift Wing (USAFE). The paratroopers were under the command of Colonel William C. Mayville Jr., commander of the 173rd Airborne Brigade. The aircraft from which the units were delivered into battle were the C-17s of the 62d and 446th Airlift Wings from McChord AFB, Washington and the 437th Airlift Wing and 315th Airlift Wing (AFRES) from Charleston AFB, South Carolina. The C-17s were under the command of Colonel Robert “Dice” R. Allardice, commander of the 62nd Airlift Wing. This airborne operation was not only the largest since the 1989 invasion of Panama, but was the first airborne personnel insertion ever conducted with the C-17.

The successful establishment of a northern front was essential to the coalition's battle plan. Without a northern front, six Iraqi divisions arrayed in northern Iraq remained free to move south to reinforce Baghdad. Fast-moving Coalition forces were closing on Baghdad with the expectation of having to capture the Iraqi capital from three defensively arrayed divisions. Six additional Iraqi divisions streaming from the north could dramatically affect the balance of power around Baghdad.

Another factor was the oil-rich area of Kirkuk Governorate. The oil wealth of the Kirkuk area would be crucial to rebuilding Iraq but the Iraqi army had shown a willingness to destroy their country's own future simply to spite the Coalition. Securing the oil fields and airbases of Kirkuk was assigned to the 173rd Airborne Brigade.

The success of the 173rd Airborne Brigade in its securing of Bashur and Kirkuk and its subsequent control and rebuilding of Kirkuk and later the As Sulaymaniyah Governorate was unmatched in-theater. The troopers integrated forces from fifteen other units, to include five Army divisions, to accomplish every mission.

Desert-colored unofficial regimental patch, utilizing "The Rock" nickname

In the summer of 2004, the 1-503rd deployed with the 2nd Brigade, 2nd Infantry Division from Korea to violent Ramadi, Iraq, where its soldiers took part in the battle of Fallujah and conducted combat operations in the violent Al-Anbar province. At that point in the war, Ramadi was considered by some to be the most dangerous city in Iraq, and the battalion suffered high losses during the deployment. 1-503rd was targeted by daily small arms, RPG, and mortar attacks and experienced a significant number of vehicle-borne improvised explosive devices, also known as VBIEDS or car bombs. Despite this, 1-503rd was very successful in their mission to curb insurgent activity. According to an interview with Lieutenant Colonel James Raymer, by 2006, insurgent activity was markedly lowered from the year that 1-503rd conducted operations in Ramadi. Additionally, 1-503rd played a critical role in the 2005 elections in Iraq in Ramadi. In the spring of 2005, the 173rd began its second deployment in three years to Afghanistan in support of Operation Enduring Freedom VI. 2d BN (ABN) 503d IN deployed to Regional Command South demonstrating unparalleled bravery fighting anti-coalition forces in the bloodiest spring since the original invasion in 2001. The ROCK fought the Taliban and Al Qaeda in the Provinces of Helmand, Zabul and Kandahar and excelled in all aspects of the deployment to include facilitating a peaceful parliamentary election process in the fall of 2005.

Upon completion of its year-long deployment to Iraq, 1-503rd did not return to Korea, but instead relocated to Fort Carson, Colorado, with the rest of the brigade. It was redesignated on 1 October 2005 as the 1st Battalion, 503rd Infantry Regiment, inactivated on 15 November 2005, relieved from assignment to the 2nd Infantry Division, and assigned on 15 June 2006 to the 173rd Airborne Brigade, where the battalion was activated with the assets of the existing 1-508th.

In May 2007, the 173rd ABCT (including both 1-503rd and 2-503rd) deployed to Afghanistan. Both units fell under the NATO ISAF mission. The 2-503rd remained as part of TF Bayonet and the unit was the subject of several articles detailing their operations during OEF VIII. The 1-503rd was attached to the 4th BCT, 82nd Airborne and then 4th BCT, 101st Airborne as part of TF Fury and TF Currahee, respectively.

On 7 February 2011, 2-503rd was awarded the Valorous Unit Award for their actions during OEF VIII from 25 January to 30 July 2008. The official citation reads: "For extraordinary heroism in action against an armed enemy. During the period 25 January 2008 to 30 July 2008, the Headquarters and Headquarters Company, 2d Battalion, 503d Infantry Regiment and its subordinate units displayed exceptionally meritorious service assigned as Task Force Rock in support of Operation Enduring Freedom in Kunar Province. Task Force Rock's professionalism and dedication to the mission under fire went beyond the call of duty and contributed greatly to the success of Task Force Bayonet. The actions of Headquarters and Headquarters Company, 2d Battalion, 503d Infantry Regiment and its subordinate units are in keeping with the finest traditions of military service and reflect great credit upon the unit, the 173d Airborne Brigade Combat Team and the United States Army". The subordinate units of HHC, 2d Battalion, 503d Infantry Regiment included: Companies A, B, C, D, F; Battery B (4th Battalion, 319th Field Artillery Regiment); Battery C, (3d Battalion, 321st Field Artillery Regiment); and Headquarters Company (Special Troops Battalion, 173d Abn Bde).

On 26 October 2011, 2-503rd was awarded the Presidential Unit Citation for the soldiers' "extraordinary heroism in action against an armed enemy" from 5 June to 10 November 2007.

Staff Sergeant Salvatore Giunta received the nation's highest award for valor after running through heavy enemy fire to rescue a badly wounded comrade during a deadly ambush on 25 October 2007, in the Korengal Valley. Soldiers from the battalion also earned two Distinguished Service Crosses, the second-highest valor award, and 27 Silver Stars, the third-highest award for valor.

== Medal of Honor recipients ==
Medal of Honor recipients:

Name	Rank	Unit	Place	Date of action	Ref.
Ray E. Eubanks †	Sergeant	Company D, 503d Parachute Infantry Regiment	Noemfoor, Dutch New Guinea	23 July 1944	
Lloyd G. McCarter	Private	503d Parachute Infantry Regiment	Corregidor Island, Philippines	16–19 February 1945	
Larry S. Pierce †	Sergeant	Headquarters Company, 1st Battalion (Airborne), 503d Infantry, 173d Airborne Brigade	near Ben Cat, Republic of Vietnam	20 September 1965	
Milton L. Olive, III †	Private First Class	Company B, 2d Battalion (Airborne), 503d Infantry, 173d Airborne Brigade	Phu Cuong, South Vietnam	22 October 1965	
Lawrence Joel	Sergeant First Class	1st Battalion (Airborne), 503d Infantry, 173d Airborne Brigade	near Bien Hoa, Vietnam	8 November 1965	
Alfred V. Rascon	Specialist Four	Medical Platoon, Headquarters Company, 1st Battalion (Airborne), 503d Infantry, 173d Airborne Brigade	near Long Khánh Province, Vietnam	16 March 1966	
Charles B. Morris	Sergeant	Company A, 2d Battalion (Airborne), 503d Infantry, 173d Airborne Brigade (Separate)	Republic of Vietnam	29 June 1966	
Don L. Michael †	Specialist Four	Company C, 4th Battalion (Airborne), 503d Infantry, 173d Airborne Brigade	Republic of Vietnam	8 April 1967	
John Andrew Barnes, III †	Private First Class	Company C, 1st Battalion (Airborne), 503d Infantry, 173d Airborne Brigade	Kontum, Vietnam	12 November 1967	
Charles J. Watters †	Chaplain (Major)	Army Chaplain Corps, 173d Support Battalion (Airborne), 503d Infantry, 173d Airborne Brigade	near Dak To Province, Republic of Vietnam	19 November 1967	
Carlos J. Lozada †	Private First Class	Company A, 2d Battalion (Airborne), 503d Infantry, 173d Airborne Brigade	Dak To, Republic of Vietnam	20 November 1967	
Michael R. Blanchfield †	Specialist Four	Company A, 4th Battalion (Airborne), 503d Infantry, 173d Airborne Brigade	Binh Dinh Province, Republic of Vietnam	3 July 1969	
Glenn H. English Jr. †	Staff Sergeant	Company E, 3d Battalion (Airborne), 503d Infantry, 173d Airborne Brigade	Phu My District, Republic of Vietnam	7 September 1970	
Salvatore Giunta	Staff Sergeant	2d Battalion, 503d Infantry Regiment, 173d Airborne Brigade	Korengal Valley, Kunar Province, Afghanistan	25 October 2007	
Kyle J. White	Specialist	2nd Battalion, 503d Infantry Regiment, 173d Airborne Brigade	Aranas, Nuristan Province, Afghanistan	9 November 2007	
Ryan M. Pitts	Staff Sergeant	2d Battalion, 503d Infantry Regiment, 173d Airborne Brigade	Wanat, Kunar Province, Afghanistan	13 July 2008	

== Silver Star recipients ==
Silver Star recipients:

- Erick, Gallardo SSG, B CO 2/503, Kunar Province, 2007
- Vincent J. Stislow, PFC, I Co 3/503, New Guinea, 1943 (later DOW, 18 Feb 1945, Corregidor).
- Joseph A Shields PFC, Feb 17 Corregidor 1945
- Paul A. Narrow, PFC, Corregidor 1945
- Ross H. Redding, PFC, Company B, 1st Battalion, 503rd Infantry, 173rd Airborne Brigade (Sep), Republic of Vietnam, 8 November 1965.
- SGT Kenneth R. Brinkley, C Company, 2nd Battalion, 503rd Infantry, 173rd Airborne Brigade, Vietnam - March 1968
- Pvt Lester Grant Viekko December 1968
- Harrison J. Meyer, PFC, D Co 1/503, Ramadi, Iraq, 2004.
- Thomas E. Vitagliano, SSG, C Co 1/503rd, Ramadi, Iraq.
- Christopher Choay, SSG, C Co 2/503, Afghanistan, 2005.
- Daniel T. Metcalfe, SFC, D Co 2/503, Sayyid Abad, Afghanistan, 2012.
- Stephen E. Simmons, SSG, Company C, 2d Battalion (Airborne), 503d Parachute Infantry Regiment, 173d Airborne Brigade Combat Team.
- Matthew Matlock, SSG, C Company 1/503 (ABN) OEF VII.
- Christopher T. Upp, SSG, Company HHC, 2d Battalion (Airborne), Chowkay Valley, Afghanistan, 2007 503d Parachute Infantry Regiment, 173d Airborne Brigade Combat Team.
- Captain (Infantry) Alan Burgess Phillips, A Co., 4/503rd, 173rd Airborne Brigade (Sep), 10 July 1967, Republic of Vietnam
- Robert J. Smith, SSG, Company A, 2nd Battalion (Airborne), 503rd Parachute Infantry Regiment, Kunar Province, Afghanistan, OEF VIII.

== In popular culture ==
- Restrepo (2010) is a documentary film about the Second Platoon, Battle Company, 2nd Battalion, 503rd Infantry Regiment (airborne) of the 173rd Airborne Brigade Combat Team in the Korangal Valley in Afghanistan.
- 84C MoPic : 1989 mock-up documentary of a Long Range Reconnaissance Patrol (LRRP) mission during the Vietnam War. C Co., 2/503, 173rd (ABN) BDE, Bon Song, Vietnam

== Lineage and honors ==
=== Lineage ===
- Constituted 24 February 1942 in the Army of the United States as the 503d Parachute Infantry (1st Battalion concurrently consolidated with the 503d Parachute Battalion [constituted 14 March 1941 in the Army of the United States and activated 22 August 1941 at Fort Benning, Georgia] and 2d Battalion consolidated with the 504th Parachute Battalion [constituted 14 March 1941 in the Army of the United States and activated 5 October at Fort Benning, Georgia] and consolidated units designated as the 1st and 2d Battalion, 503d Parachute Infantry)
- Regiment (less 1st, 2d and 3d Battalions) activated 2 March 1942 at Fort Benning, Georgia

(3d Battalion activated 8 June 1942 at Fort Bragg, North Carolina)
(2d Battalion reorganized and redesignated 2 November 1942 as the 2d Battalion, 509th Parachute Infantry – hereafter separate lineage; new 2d Battalion, 503d Infantry concurrently activated in Australia)

- Regiment inactivated 24 December 1945 at Camp Anza, California
- Redesignated 1 February 1951 as the 503d Airborne Infantry, allotted to the Regular Army, and assigned to the 11th Airborne Division
- Activated 2 March 1951 at Fort Campbell, Kentucky
- Relieved 1 March 1957 from assignment to the 11th Airborne Division' concurrently reorganized and redesignated as the 503d Infantry, a parent regiment under the Combat Arms Regimental System
- Withdrawn 16 December 1986 from the Combat Arms Regimental System and reorganized under the United States Army Regimental System
- Redesignated 1 October 2005 as the 503d Infantry Regiment

=== Campaign participation credit ===
- World War II: New Guinea; Leyte; Luzon (with arrowhead); Southern Philippines
- Vietnam: Defense; Counteroffensive; Counteroffensive, Phase II (with arrowhead); Counteroffensive, Phase III; Counteroffensive, Phase IV; Counteroffensive, Phase V; Counteroffensive, Phase VI; Tet 69/Counteroffensive; Summer–Fall 1969; Winter–Spring 1970; Sanctuary Counteroffensive; Counteroffensive, Phase VII; Consolidation I
- Afghanistan: Consolidation I, Consolidation II, Consolidation III, Transition I
- Iraq: Liberation of Iraq (with arrowhead); Transition of Iraq; Iraqi Governance

Note: The published Army lineage predates the War on Terrorism. Comparison of the deployment dates of regimental elements with the War on Terrorism campaigns estimates that the battalion will be credited with participation in the six campaigns listed.

=== Decorations ===
- Presidential Unit Citation (Army) for CORREGIDOR
- Presidential Unit Citation (Army) for BIEN HOA
- Presidential Unit Citation (Army) for PHUOC VINH
- Presidential Unit Citation (Army) for DAK TO
- Presidential Unit Citation (Navy) for VIETNAM 1966
- Presidential Unit Citation (Army) for Afghanistan 5 Jun 2007 to 10 Nov 2007
- Valorous Unit Award for TUY HOA
- Valorous Unit Award for Afghanistan 7 May 2007 to 1 Jan 2008
- Valorous Unit Award for Afghanistan 25 Jan 2008 to 30 Jul 2008
- Meritorious Unit Commendation (Army) for VIETNAM 1965-1967
- Meritorious Unit Commendation (Army) for Iraq 26 Mar 2003 to 6 Nov 2003
- Meritorious Unit Commendation (Army) for Afghanistan 9 Dec 2009 to 14 Nov 2010
- Meritorious Unit Commendation (Army) for Afghanistan 31 Dec 2009 to 18 Nov 2010
- Meritorious Unit Commendation (Army) for Afghanistan 19 Jul 2012 to 15 Mar 2013
- Philippine Presidential Unit Citation for 17 OCTOBER 1944 TO 4 JULY 1945
- Navy Unit Commendation (Navy) for AR RAMADI 2005

== Heraldry ==
=== Distinctive unit insignia ===
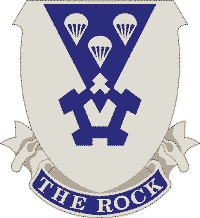

- Description/Blazon: A silver color metal and enamel device 1 1/8 inches (2.9 cm) in height overall consisting of the shield and motto of the coat of arms.
- Symbolism: The colors, blue and white, are those of Infantry. The inverted triangle terminating in the broken fort symbolizes the drop on Corregidor, whereas the three parachutes represent the three other battle honors awarded the organization.
- Background: The distinctive unit insignia was originally approved for the 503d Airborne Infantry Regiment on 28 Apr 1952. It was amended to change the motto on 28 May 1952. On 29 Jun 1958 the insignia was redesignated to the 503d Infantry.

=== Coat of arms ===
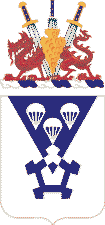

- Description/Blazon
  - Shield: Argent, a fort voided Azure, pierced to the center by a pile of the second counterchanged with the fort and bearing three parachutes of the first, two and one.
  - Crest: On a wreath of the colors Argent and Azure a dragon passant Gules in front of three swords, points conjoined in base Proper, with hand grips of the second nailed and edged Or, in center overall a carved arrowhead point down of the last.
  - Motto: THE ROCK.
- Symbolism
  - Shield: The colors, blue and white, are those of Infantry. The inverted triangle terminating in the broken fort symbolizes the drop on Corregidor, whereas the three parachutes represent the three other battle honors awarded the organization.
  - Crest: The dragon and the colors scarlet and yellow refer to the Republic of Vietnam where the Regiment participated in thirteen campaigns; scarlet also alludes to the award of the Meritorious Unit Commendation. The unit's participation in an assault landing during the Counteroffensive, Phase II, is indicated by the arrowhead and the swords with blue grips represent the Presidential Unit Citation awarded three times for service in the Republic of Vietnam.
- Background: The Coat of Arms was originally approved for the 503d Airborne Infantry Regiment on 28 Apr 1952. It was amended to change the motto on 28 May 1952. The coat of arms was redesignated for the 503d Infantry on 29 Jan 1958.
