= James English =

James English may refer to:

- James E. English (1812–1890), United States Representative and Senator from Connecticut
- James F. English Jr. (1927–2020), American college president (Trinity College, Connecticut)
- James L. English (1813–1889), American lawyer and Democratic politician
- James Towers English (1782–1819), brigadier general, commander of the British Legion in the South American Wars of Independence
- James W. English (1837–1925), American politician and soldier
- Jim English (1932–2008), Irish hurler
- Leo James English (1907–1997), Australian compiler and editor of bilingual dictionaries in the Philippines
