= Niall J. English =

Irish inventor, chemical engineer

- Citizenship: Irish
- Education: University College Dublin (BE, PhD)
- Occupations: Academic, inventor, chemical engineer

Niall Joseph English is an Irish chemical engineer, inventor and researcher. He is a co-founder and director of two "spin-out" companies associated with University College Dublin.

== Early life and education ==
Born in Ireland, Niall J. English obtained a first class honours degree in Chemical engineering from University College Dublin (UCD) in 2000, and completed a Ph.D. in 2003.

== Career ==
In 2004-2005, English worked as a research assistant at the US DOE National Energy Technology Laboratory in Pittsburgh. Between 2005 and 2007, he worked for Chemical Computing Group in Cambridge, Great Britain. During this time, he developed molecular simulation codes, protocols, and methods for biomolecular simulation.

In January 2007, English was hired as a lecturer at UCD's School of Chemical and Bioprocess Engineering. He was promoted to senior lecturer in 2014 and professor in 2017.

English’s research specializes in nanoscience, energy, gas hydrates, solar and renewable energies, and simulation of electromagnetic field effects on (nano) materials and biological systems.

As of 2021, he was a co-founder and director of BioSimulytics and Aqua-B. Both companies are backed by the EIC-Accelerator program.

In 2023, he took legal action against UCD to block the university from granting a commercialization license to his rival companies. The case was settled out of court.

== Publications ==
- (2012b). Photo-induced charge separation across the graphene–tio2 interface is faster than energy losses: A time-domain ab initio analysis. Journal of the American Chemical Society, 134/34: 14238–48. DOI: 10.1021/ja3063953
- (2015). English, N. J., & Waldron, C. J. Perspectives on External Electric Fields in molecular simulation: Progress, prospects and challenges. Physical Chemistry Chemical Physics. The Royal Society of Chemistry.
- (2003) English, N. J., & MacElroy, J. M. D. Molecular dynamics simulations of microwave heating of water. AIP Publishing. AIP Publishing.
- (2007) Rosenbaum, E. J., English, N. J., Johnson, J. K., Shaw, D. W., & Warzinski, R. P. (2007). Thermal conductivity of methane hydrate from experiment and molecular simulation. The Journal of Physical Chemistry B, 111/46: 13194–205. DOI: 10.1021/jp074419o
- (2005) English, N. J., Johnson, J. K., & Taylor, C. E. Molecular-dynamics simulations of Methane Hydrate Dissociation. AIP Publishing. AIP Publishing.
- (2014) English, N. J., & MacElroy, J. M. D. Perspectives on molecular simulation of clathrate hydrates: Progress, prospects and challenges. Chemical Engineering Science. Pergamon.
- (2010) Long, R., & English, N. J. Synergistic effects on band gap-narrowing in Titania by codoping from first-principles calculations. Chemistry of Materials, 22/5: 1616–23. DOI: 10.1021/cm903688z
- (2004) English, N. J., & MacElroy, J. M. D. Theoretical studies of the kinetics of methane hydrate crystallization in external electromagnetic fields. The Journal of chemical physics. U.S. National Library of Medicine.
- (2003a) English, N. J., & MacElroy, J. M. D. (2003a). Hydrogen bonding and molecular mobility in liquid water in external electromagnetic fields. AIP Publishing.
- (2009) Long, R., & English, N. J.First-principles calculation of nitrogen-tungsten codoping effects on the band structure of anatase-titania. AIP Publishing.
