= John Hawker English =

English doctor and surgeon (1788–1840)

- Born: 1788
- Died: 1840 (aged 51–52)

Sir John Hawker English, M.D. (1788–1840) was an English medical doctor. He entered the employment of the king of Sweden as surgeon, and became surgeon-in-chief to the Swedish army.

In recognition of his services he was decorated with the order of Gustavus Vasa in 1813, and, having received permission to accept it, was knighted by the prince regent in 1815. On leaving Sweden he graduated M.D. both at Göttingen (3 March 1814) and at Aberdeen (26 May 1823), being admitted a licentiate of the College of Physicians on 25 June following.

He resided at Warley House, Essex, but died 25 June 1840 while at St. Leonards-on-Sea.
