= Keith English =

Keith English may refer to:

- Keith English (end) (1927–1989), Canadian football player
- Keith English (politician) (1967–2018), American politician
- Keith English (punter) (1966–2010), American football player
