= Diane Reay =

British academic and professor of education

Diane Reay is a sociologist and academic, and emeritus professor of education at the University of Cambridge. She is noted for her study about educational inequalities among students in state schools in the United Kingdom. She has maintained that there is a tendency to misuse the school selection practice to transform social class differences into education. She has criticised the Oxbridge application process as "institutionally racist".

== Working-class student experiences ==
Reay's research highlights the challenges that working-class students have in higher education, in particular when accessing and transitioning to and within higher education.

== Background ==
Reay is the daughter of a coal miner and the eldest of eight children. She grew up on a council estate and received free school meals. In an interview, she said, "I learned as a small child I had to work at least twice as hard as the middle-class children to achieve the same result."

She taught in a London primary school for 20 years before she began work at Cambridge, where she is an emeritus professor of sociology of education.

== Selected publications ==
- Reay, Diane. Miseducation: Inequality, Education and the Working Classes. Bristol University Press, 2017, https://doi.org/10.2307/j.ctt22p7k7m.
