= Joe English =

Joe or Joseph English may refer to:

- Joe English (loyalist), former Ulster loyalist activist
- Joe English (musician) (born 1949), American musician
- Joe English (painter) (1882–1918), Flemish draughtsman and painter
- Joe English (sailor), (1956–2014), Irish Yachtsman
- Joseph Craig English, American artist
- Joseph English (architect) (died 1927), Australian architect with the firm English and Soward
- Joseph English (athlete), British middle-distance runner
- Joseph T. English, American psychiatrist, academic, and healthcare administrator
