= Charles English =

Charles or Charlie English may refer to:

- Charles English (politician) (1902–1974), Australian politician
- Charles L. English (born 1951), American diplomat
- Charlie English (baseball) (1910–1999), American baseball player
- Charlie English (writer) (born 1967), British writer and journalist
