= Garry English =

Australian rules footballer

Personal information
- Full name: Garry English
- Born: 7 January 1935
- Died: 17 February 2007 (aged 72)
- Original team: Lincoln Stars
- Height: 175 cm (5 ft 9 in)
- Weight: 76 kg (168 lb)
- Position: Defense

Playing career^{1}
Years	Club	Games (Goals)
1954–59	North Melbourne	71 (3)
- ^{1} Playing statistics correct to the end of 1959.

Garry English (7 January 1935 – 17 February 2007) was a former Australian rules footballer who played with North Melbourne in the Victorian Football League (VFL).
