= Glenn H. English Jr. =

Glenn Harry English Jr.
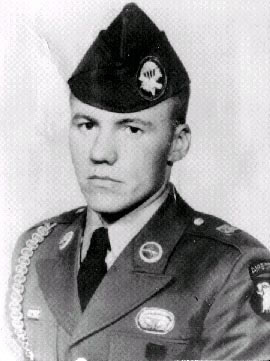
- Glenn English
- Born: April 23, 1940; Altoona, Pennsylvania, U.S.
- Died: September 7, 1970 (aged 30); Phu My District, Binh Dinh Province, Republic of Vietnam
- Burial place: Alto Reste Burial Park, Altoona, Pennsylvania (Ft Bragg, North Carolina post cemetery)
- Military career
- Allegiance: United States of America
- Branch: United States Army
- Service years: 1962–1970
- Rank: Staff Sergeant
- Units: Company E, 3d Battalion (Airborne), 503d Infantry, 173d Airborne Brigade
- Conflicts: Vietnam War †
- Awards: Medal of Honor; Bronze Star; Purple Heart

Glenn Harry English Jr. (April 23, 1940 – September 7, 1970) was a United States Army soldier and a recipient of the United States military's highest decoration—the Medal of Honor—for his actions in the Vietnam War.

While serving in a 4-vehicle column in Binh Dinh Province, a North Vietnamese platoon ambushed the force. One of the trucks was hit, and English tried to save one of the 3 men inside the vehicle, even though he knew the truck would explode. Before English could pull out the man, the truck exploded, killing English and the three other men. He was awarded the Medal of Honor in 1971 for this action.

== Biography ==
English joined the Army from Philadelphia, Pennsylvania in 1962, and by September 7, 1970, was serving as a staff sergeant in Company E, 3d Battalion (Airborne), 503d Infantry, 173d Airborne Brigade. On that day, in Phu My District, Republic of Vietnam, he attempted to save a man trapped inside a burning armored personnel carrier, despite warnings the vehicle could explode at any moment. The personnel carrier did explode, and both English and the man he was trying to rescue were killed.

English, aged 30 at his death, was buried at the Alto Reste Cemetery in Altoona, PA and memorialized at the Fort Bragg Main Post Cemetery in Fort Bragg, North Carolina.

== Medal of Honor citation ==
Staff Sergeant English's official Medal of Honor citation reads:

S/Sgt. English was riding in the lead armored personnel carrier in a 4-vehicle column when an enemy mine exploded in front of his vehicle. As the vehicle swerved from the road, a concealed enemy force waiting in ambush opened fire with automatic weapons and anti-tank grenades, striking the vehicle several times and setting it on fire. S/Sgt. English escaped from the disabled vehicle and, without pausing to extinguish the flames on his clothing, rallied his stunned unit. He then led it in a vigorous assault, in the face of heavy enemy automatic weapons fire, on the entrenched enemy position. This prompt and courageous action routed the enemy and saved his unit from destruction. Following the assault, S/Sgt. English heard the cries of 3 men still trapped inside the vehicle. Paying no heed to warnings that the ammunition and fuel in the burning personnel carrier might explode at any moment, S/Sgt. English raced to the vehicle and climbed inside to rescue his wounded comrades. As he was lifting 1 of the men to safety, the vehicle exploded, mortally wounding him and the man he was attempting to save. By his extraordinary devotion to duty, indomitable courage, and utter disregard for his own safety, S/Sgt. English saved his unit from destruction and selflessly sacrificed his life in a brave attempt to save 3 comrades. S/Sgt. English's conspicuous gallantry and intrepidity in action at the cost of his life were an inspiration to his comrades and are in the highest traditions of the U.S. Army.

== Awards and decorations ==
English has been awarded the following during his military career:

Badge	Combat Infantryman Badge		
1st row	Medal of Honor		Bronze Star with 1 bronze Oak leaf cluster (2 awards)
2nd row	Purple Heart with 1 bronze Oak leaf cluster (2 awards)	Air Medal	Army Commendation Medal
3rd row	Army Good Conduct Medal with a bronze clasp with 3 loops	Army of Occupation Medal (1945-1990)	National Defense Service Medal
4th row	Vietnam Service Medal with 2 silver Campaign stars	Vietnam Civil Actions Medal (First Class)	Vietnam Campaign Medal with "60-" clasp
Badges	Ranger Tab		Basic Parachutist Badge

== See also ==
- List of Medal of Honor recipients for the Vietnam War
