= Paul English =

Paul English may refer to:

- Paul English (drummer) (1932–2020), American drummer with Willie Nelson
- Paul M. English (born 1963), American entrepreneur and philanthropist
