= Mark English =

Mark English may refer to:

- Mark English (athlete) (born 1993), Irish middle-distance runner
- Mark English (illustrator) (1933–2019), American illustrator and painter
