= David English =

David English may refer to:

- David English (cricketer) (1946–2022), British cricketer, actor, writer and music manager, creator of The Bunbury Tails
- Sir David English (editor) (1931–1998), British newspaper editor (Daily Mail, 1971–92)
- David English (hurler), Irish hurler
- Melvin Franklin (1942–1995; born David Melvin English), American bass singer
