= Mary English =

Mary English may refer to:

- Mary English (Anglo-Colombian) (1789–1846), Anglo-Colombian adventurer, landowner, trade representative, farmer and businesswoman
- Mary English (mycologist) (1919–2009), British mycologist and historian
- Mary English (born c. 1962), spouse of the prime minister of New Zealand

== See also ==
- Mary Draper Ingles (also known Mary English; 1732– 1815), American pioneer
