= William English (poet) =

Irish poet

- Died: 1778
- Occupation: poet
- Known for: Cashel of Munster

William English (died 1778) was an Irish poet.

English was a native of Newcastle West, County Limerick. After teaching schools at Castletownroche and Charleville, he finally entered the Augustinian order. He died at Cork on 13 January 1778 and was buried in St. John's churchyard. As a Gaelic poet of humble life English acquired considerable reputation. His best-known ballad, "Cashel of Munster", was translated by Sir Samuel Ferguson in Lays of the Western Gael (1864), pp. 209–10.
