= Alex English (comedian) =

American stand-up comedian and writer

Alex English is an American stand-up comedian and writer. He was a writer for Saturday Night Live for three years and received three Emmy nomination for Outstanding Writing For A Variety Series for all three seasons. Vulture named him one of 2022's "Comedians You Should and Will Know.” The New York Times called English one of 2022's "The Queer Young Comics Redefining American Humor." He has appeared or written on the reboot of the National Lampoon Radio Hour, Inside Amy Schumer, That Damn Michael Che, Pause with Sam Jay, and High Maintenance.

== Career ==
English moved to New York in 2012, and soon after began doing stand-up while working at coffee shops and other jobs. In 2017, he became a regular on Lady Parts Justice's Vagical Mystery Tour.

English was in the writer's room for The Rundown with Robin Thede on BET, HBO’s That Damn Michael Che, Netflix's The Fix with Jimmy Carr, and Pause with Sam Jay on HBO.

In 2017, English appeared on SeeSo’s Night Train with Wyatt Cenac, and in 2021, on lIana Glazer Presents: Tight Five.

English joined the SNL writers' room in 2021 for season 47. Some of the sketches that he was co-writer on included "Hot Girl Hospital," "Nice Jail," and "Lisa from Temecula." He earned Emmy nods during his tenure on SNL for Outstanding Writing For A Variety Series. In 2024, he announced on social media that he'd "been relieved of my duties" at the show.

English and Sam Jay launched Look Back On it, their podcast, in 2026.

== Personal ==
English lives in New York City, where he is a regular performer at the Comedy Cellar. He is a Detroit native.
