= Walter English =

American composer, conductor and tubist (1876–1916)

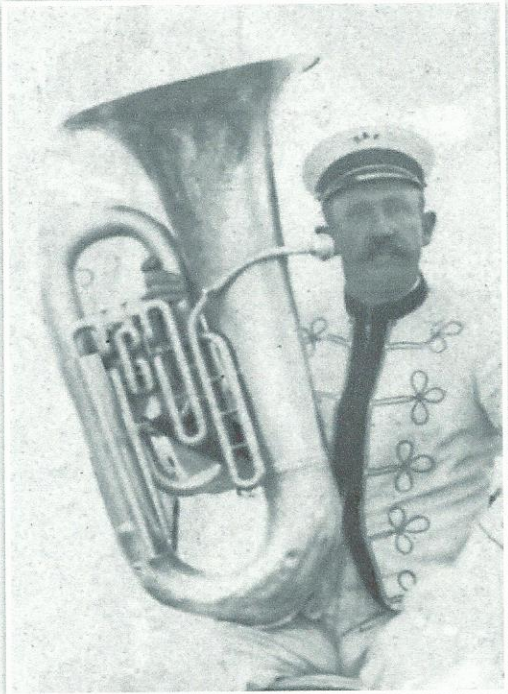
Walter English, date unknown

Walter Paul "Woody" English (March 20, 1867 – June 4, 1916) was an American composer, conductor, and tubist.

== Life and career ==
English's march "Royal Decree"

Walter Paul English was born in Salt Lake City, Utah Territory in 1867. He grew up in Dallas, Texas (Smith) playing tuba in various bands. In 1891 he joined the circus band on the Great New York Circus in Oakland, California (Smith). In 1892 he joined the band on the McMahon Circus (Smith). During the next three years he travelled with circus bands on Howe & Cushing, Sands & Astley and Harris Nickel Plate Shows (Smith).

He played tuba in Carl Clair's band for the European tour of Barnum & Bailey's Greatest Show on Earth at the turn of the century (1897–1903). He took up the conducting baton from an ailing Carl Clair in 1907. In 1909 he played for Norris & Rowe (Smith). English spent three years with the Sells-Floto Circus. In 1913, he played tuba for The Girl of Eagle Ranch production, thereafter rejoining Sells Floto (under the baton of his friend Karl L. King). King and English subsequently co-authored a march, "Howdy Pap." In contrast to the tall, thin King, Walter English was rather stout, and he wore a walrus mustache. King later recalled that the first time he met Walter English was when English invited him to his hotel room. Walter English loved cats, and the room was filled with music paper and cats.

The remainder of his life he played with assorted circus and concert bands, including Frederick Neil Innes' Denver Concert Band, and died in Denver, Colorado in 1916 (Death Notice).

W. P. English is known primarily for his band compositions, most of which were published by C.L. Barnhouse Company of Oskaloosa, Iowa. In 1984, English was elected to the (Circus Band) Windjammer's Hall of Fame.

== Works ==
His works (published by C. L. Barnhouse unless otherwise listed) include:

- Arizona Club March (pub. York 1909)
- Basses Conquest March (aka King Bombardon 1912/1927, pub. Rubank, Inc.)
- Beyond the Rockies March 1905
- Clair's Triumph March 1900 (dedicated to Carl Clair, circus bandmaster)
- Culinary King March (pub. Will Smith 1917)
- Floto's Grand Pageant March (pub. Jenkins 1915)
- Girl of Eagle Ranch March (pub. Jenkins 1914)
- Howdy Pap March 1913 (collaborated with Karl L. King )
- Instantaneous Rag (pub. Jenkins 1915)
- Jewell's Triumphal March (pub. York 1908)
- King Bombardon March (aka Basses Conquest 1912)
- Martin's Boast March (Martin Inst. Co 1915)
- Mile A Minute Galop, 1903
- Neel's Fashion Plate March 1902
- New York, London & Paris March 1903 (during Barnum & Bailey tour)
- Princess Clothilde Mazurka (band arrangement by Loren Geiger)
- Relpetrom March (pub, York 1907, dedicated to Mort Epler)
- Royal Decree March 1916 (his most famous march used by circus bands to accompany elephant and wild jungle animal acts, dedicated to Karl L. King)
- Royal Pageant March (pub. Boos 1895)
- Salute to Alexander March 1902 (dedicated to his friend Russell Alexander)
- Tent City March (pub. Carl Fischer 1907)
- Under White Tents Galop (pub. Boos 1894)
- The Volitant March, 1904
- Wild Fire Galop, 1909 (dedicated to Albert C. Sweet, circus bandmaster)

== Sources ==
- Bierley, Paul Edmund, Heritage Encyclopedia of the Band's Music, Integrity Press (using information provided by Loren Geiger)
- Geiger, Loren, Boombah Herald Newsletter
- Smith, Norman MARCH MUSIC NOTES, Program Note Press 1986 (from information provided by Loren Geiger, Paul Luckey – Circus World Museum, Sverre O Braathen – author on circus bands, John Jarosch – circus baritone player, Merle Evans – Ringling Bros Barnum & Bailey Bandmaster)
- Utah Bureau of Vital Statistics, Birth Certificate
- Hatton, Thomas J., Karl L. King, An American Bandmaster, 1975, The Instrumentalist Co.
