= Tom English (footballer, born 1983) =

English footballer (born 1983)

Personal information
- Full name: Tom English
- Date of birth: 25 December 1983 (age 42)
- Place of birth: Easington, England
- Position: Defender

Youth career
- 2000-2003: Newcastle United

Senior career*
| Years | Team | Apps | (Gls) |
| 2003-2004 | Livingston | 0 | (0) |
| 2004 | Partick Thistle | 2 | (0) |
| 2004-2006 | Queen of the South | 46 | (1) |
- Durham City
- Spennymoor United
- Bedlington Terriers
- Ashington
- * Club domestic league appearances and goals

Tom English (born 25 December 1983) is an English former footballer who played as a defender for Queen of the South and Livingston.

== Career ==
=== Youth career ===
English began his career in the Newcastle United youth academy but left the club before signing professional terms with the Magpies.

=== Livingston ===
He signed a two-and-a-half-year deal with Livingston in 2003 after impressing during a 3-day trial. Unfortunately the timing of his signing could not have been worse as Livi went into administration in 2004 and English was one of six players to have their contracts terminated. English failed to make a single first team appearance during his short stay at the Almondvale Stadium.

=== Partick Thistle ===
Shortly after his release from Livi, English signed for Partick Thistle in February 2004. He made his debut on 28 February 2004, in a 3–0 defeat away to Motherwell in the Scottish Premier League. He was released from the club at the end of the 2003–2004 season.

=== Queen of the South ===
Following his release from Thistle, he signed for Queen of the South on 30 June 2004. He scored from the penalty spot on his debit in a 2-0 Scottish League Cup win against Airdrieonians on 31 July 2004. English made 46 appearances and scored one goal before leaving Queens in 2006.

=== Move back home ===
English played the rest of his career in non-league football in England for Durham City, Spennymoor United, Bedlington Terriers, Ashington.
