= Robert English =

Robert English may refer to:

- Robert A. J. English, captain of the Bear of Oakland on the Byrd Antarctic Expedition 1933–35, after whom English Coast is named
- Robert D. English (born 1958), American historian
- Robert English (actor) (1878–1941), British actor
- Robert Henry English (1888–1943), American admiral
