= Grace English =

British painter (1891-1956)

- Born: 1891; London, England
- Died: 1956 (aged 64–65)
- Known for: Painting

Grace Geraldine English (1891-4 December 1956) was a British painter and etcher.

== Biography ==
English was born in London and as a teenager spent time in Paris and Germany. In Germany she met I. A. R. Wylie and produced illustrations for her book on the Black Forest. Returning to London in 1912 she studied at the Slade School of Art in the city until 1914. At the Slade she won a painting prize. During World War I, English worked in a munitions factory and also produced machine drawings. After the war she studied etching at the Royal College of Art during 1921. Throughout her career English painted portraits, flowers and ballet dancers. Her work was shown by the New Society of Artists and she was a regular exhibitor at the Royal Academy and at the New English Art Club and with the Royal Society of British Artists and the Royal Society of Portrait Painters. Leeds City Art Gallery holds examples of her work.
