= Senator English =

Senator English may refer to:

- J. Kalani English (fl. 2000s–2010s), Hawaii State Senate
- James E. English (1812–1890), U.S. Senator from Connecticut
- Jane English (politician) (born 1940), Arkansas State Senate
- Karan English (born 1949), Arizona State Senate
- Warren B. English (1840–1913), California State Senate
- William F. English (1934–2021), Georgia State Senate
