= Jack English (photographer) =

Jack English (born 13 June 1948) is a photographer, known for his work in the film and music industries. He has taken stills for films such as Nil by Mouth, The Fifth Element, Joan of Arc, Tyrannosaur, Tinker Tailor Soldier Spy, The Snowman, Darkest Hour and Slow Horses.

== Early life ==
English is the first of two sons born in Leicester, to businessman Jack English and Dutch mother Jansje Schoen. He attended Ashby Grammar School.

Friends of English at the time include Leicester natives fashion photographer David Parkinson and musician Ric Grech (Family and Blind Faith) both of whom died young.

English's younger brother William attended the London Film School in 1972, encouraging Jack to move to London where he worked at the International Telephone Exchange on Carter Lane.

In the autumn of 1978, Jack was involved in setting up a PX clothes shop in Covent Garden with Roger Burton. He and Burton then left to form Contemporary Wardrobe, leading to a commission to supply the costumes for the film Quadrophenia and independent styling work for MPL (Paul McCartney), Italian Vogue and Boulevard.

After his mother's death from cancer, English spent five years working for oil companies in Madagascar, Nigeria and rigs in the North Sea, eventually becoming a flaneur/plongeur in his brother William's restaurant in London's Borough Market (Dining Room 1980–1990). Here, his brother introduced him to avant-garde film. In 1981, an interview English conducted with Kenneth Anger in New York was published in Time Out magazine, and was later republished in the summer 1983 edition of On Film.

== Photography ==
English's interest in photography grew from a longstanding love of film, further fueled by his work in the fashion industry. In 1989, using a borrowed camera, English photographed jazz musician Chet Baker after a chance encounter in Cannes, followed by a portrait of Andy Warhol that was published in The Sunday Times magazine.

In 1992, English made a decision to abstain from drugs and alcohol and concentrate on a career as a photographer.

This new focus lead to several commissions. Eric Clapton hired English to photograph his 1992 tour of the US with Elton John as well as shoot images for the liner notes of his 1994 blues album From the Cradle. During this period English also worked as a photographer with Charlie Watts.

Clapton's album From The Cradle caught the eye of Gary Oldman, who was preparing to shoot his debut film Nil By Mouth. Oldman was not looking for traditional "film stills" and sought out English for a meeting, ultimately recruiting him for the job.

Oldman later recommended English to director Luc Besson, who then hired him to take photos on many of his blockbuster films, including The Fifth Element and Joan of Arc.

Stills from Nil by Mouth and Joan of Arc are available in book form.

After taking a break from shooting film stills to focus on other work, including an exhibition of the Los Angeles homeless population, English returned in 2008 to shoot Roger Donaldson's The Bank Job. This began a stint of working on acclaimed British films, including Paddy Considine's BIFA-winning directorial debut Tyrannosaur, Tomas Alfredson's Oscar nominated and BAFTA award-winning Tinker Tailor Soldier Spy, Peter Strickland's BIFA-winning Berberian Sound Studio and Lynne Ramsay's BAFTA award-winning short film Swimmer.

English's stills from Tinker Tailor Soldier Spy were particularly lauded, featuring on the cover of Italian Vogue's February 2012 issue and as part of a travelling exhibition sponsored by Paul Smith.

In 2013, English worked on Gavin O'Connor's Jane Got a Gun, Woody Allen's Magic in the Moonlight and Morten Tyldum's The Imitation Game.

In 2014, he photographed the stills of Luca Guadagnino's A Bigger Splash.

English is currently working on the eighth series of Slow Horses for Apple TV, having completed the other seven.

== Style and influences ==
In his feature film work, English has said that he thinks about the style and context of any film he works on, and how to replicate this in his pictures. He has said that when it comes to his work he finds ‘painters more influential – the Surrealists, for example. He has mentioned Francis Bacon as an influence on his work on Nil By Mouth and the work of Irving Penn on his work on Tinker Tailor Soldier Spy. Other photographers English admires include Paul Graham, Robert Frank, German visual artist Gerhardt Richter, and Saul Leiter.
