= Lyn English =

Australian mathematics education scholar

Lyndall Denise (Lyn) English is an Australian scholar whose research concerns primary and secondary school mathematics education, "focused mainly on analogical reasoning and problem solving in early childhood, statistical reasoning as data modelling, mathematical modelling of complex systems, and links between mathematical and scientific development". She is a professor in the Faculty of Creative Industries, Education & Social Justice, and School of Teacher Education & Leadership, at Queensland University of Technology, and founding editor-in-chief of the journal Mathematical Thinking and Learning.

== Education and career ==
English was a student at the Kelvin Grove College of Advanced Education, from which she has bachelor's and master's degrees in education. She became a primary school teacher in Queensland from 1974 to 1978, and served as the mathematics curriculum coordinator for the open access unit in Brisbane from 1979 to 1985.

She has a PhD from the University of Queensland, for which she received the outstanding dissertation awards of the Australian Association for Research in Education and of the Association for Supervision and Curriculum Development in 1989.

She joined the Queensland University of Technology as a lecturer in 1982, and was promoted to senior lecturer in 1988, associate professor in 1992, and professor in 2000. She has been associate director of the Centre for Mathematics and Science Education since 1993.

She founded Mathematical Thinking and Learning in 1997, and continues to serve as its editor-in-chief.

== Recognition ==
English was elected to the Academy of the Social Sciences in Australia in 2003.

The Mathematics Education Research Group of Australasia gave her their 1997 Beth Southwell Practical Implications Award, and their 2012 Career Research Medal.

== Books ==
English is the coauthor of:

- Mathematics Education: Models and Processes (with Graeme S. Halford, Lawrence Erlbaum Associates, 1995)

Her edited volumes include:

- Mathematical Reasoning: Analogies, Metaphors, and Images (edited, Lawrence Erlbaum Associates, 1997)
- Handbook of International Research in Mathematics Education (edited, Lawrence Erlbaum Associates, 2002; 2nd ed., Routledge, 2009; 3rd ed., with David Kirshner, 2015)
- Mathematical and Analogical Reasoning of Young Learners (edited, Lawrence Erlbaum Associates, 2004)
- Theories of Mathematics Education: Seeking New Frontiers (edited with Bharath Sriraman, Springer, 2009)
- Reconceptualizing Early Mathematics Learning (edited with Joanne T. Mulligan, Springer, 2013)
- Early Engineering Learning (edited with Tamara Moore, Springer, 2018)
- Growing the Research Base for Mathematical Modeling with Young Learners (edited with Jennifer Suh and Megan Wickstrom, Springer, 2021)
