= Judie English =

British archaeologist (1947–2025)

Judie English FSA MCIfA (June 1947 – 9 May 2025) was a British archaeologist.

== Biography ==
English gained her PhD from the University of Sussex. Her thesis was titled Pattern and progress: field systems of the second and early first millennia BC in southern Britain, latter published as a monograph. She undertook extensive fieldwork in Sussex and Surrey.

She joined the Surrey Archaeology Society in 1976 and eventually served as its vice-president. She was a Member of the Chartered Institute for Archaeologists and a Trustee of the Council for British Archaeology South-East. She was a Fellow of the Society of Antiquaries of London.

== Select publications ==
- English, J. 2002. "A hoard of Late Bronze Age metalwork from the Hog's Back, near Guildford", Surrey Archaeological Collections 89, 249–250.
- English, J. 2004. "Two late nineteenth-century military earthworks on Ash Ranges, near Aldershot, Surrey", Landscape History 26, 87–93.
- English, J. 2005. "Two examples of Roman pottery repair in antiquity", Surrey Archaeological Collections 92, 263–265.
- English, J., Winser, K., and Newell, J. 2016. "The Iron Age enclosure and First World War Prisoner of War camp at Felday, Holmbury St Mary, near Dorking", Surrey Archaeological Collections 99, 149–164.
- English, J. 2023. "A Mediterranean ceramic mercury jar from the site of medieval Baynards, Ewhurst", Surrey Archaeological Collections 105, 237–241.
