= English, Brazoria County, Texas =

Unincorporated community in Brazoria County, Texas

English, Texas
- Unincorporated community
- Location within Texas Location within the United States
- Coordinates: 29°22′27″N 95°31′40″W
- Country: United States
- State: Texas
- County: Brazoria
- Elevation: 52 ft (16 m)
- Time zone: UTC-6 (Central (CST))
  - Summer (DST): UTC-5 (CDT)
- Area code: 979
- GNIS feature ID: 1379726

English is an unincorporated community located at County Road 42 and Oyster Creek in northern Brazoria County, Texas, United States. It is located within the Greater Houston metropolitan area.

== History ==
The community may have been named after the family of an area resident named "Buck" English. English began as a station of the Sugar Land Railway, located 1.5 miles (2.4 km) north of what is now Farm to Market Road 1462 on Oyster Creek. In 1917, English had a general store and a cotton gin. In 1921, a post office opened in English, closing in 1924 with its functions transferring to the office in Sandy Point. Area maps from the 1980s show several scattered residences and abandoned buildings.

== Geography ==
English is north of the Ramsey Unit and 12 miles (19 km) northwest of Angleton.

== Education ==
Today, the community is served by the Angleton Independent School District. Children in the area attend Frontier Elementary School, Angleton Junior High School, and Angleton High School in Angleton.

== Gallery ==
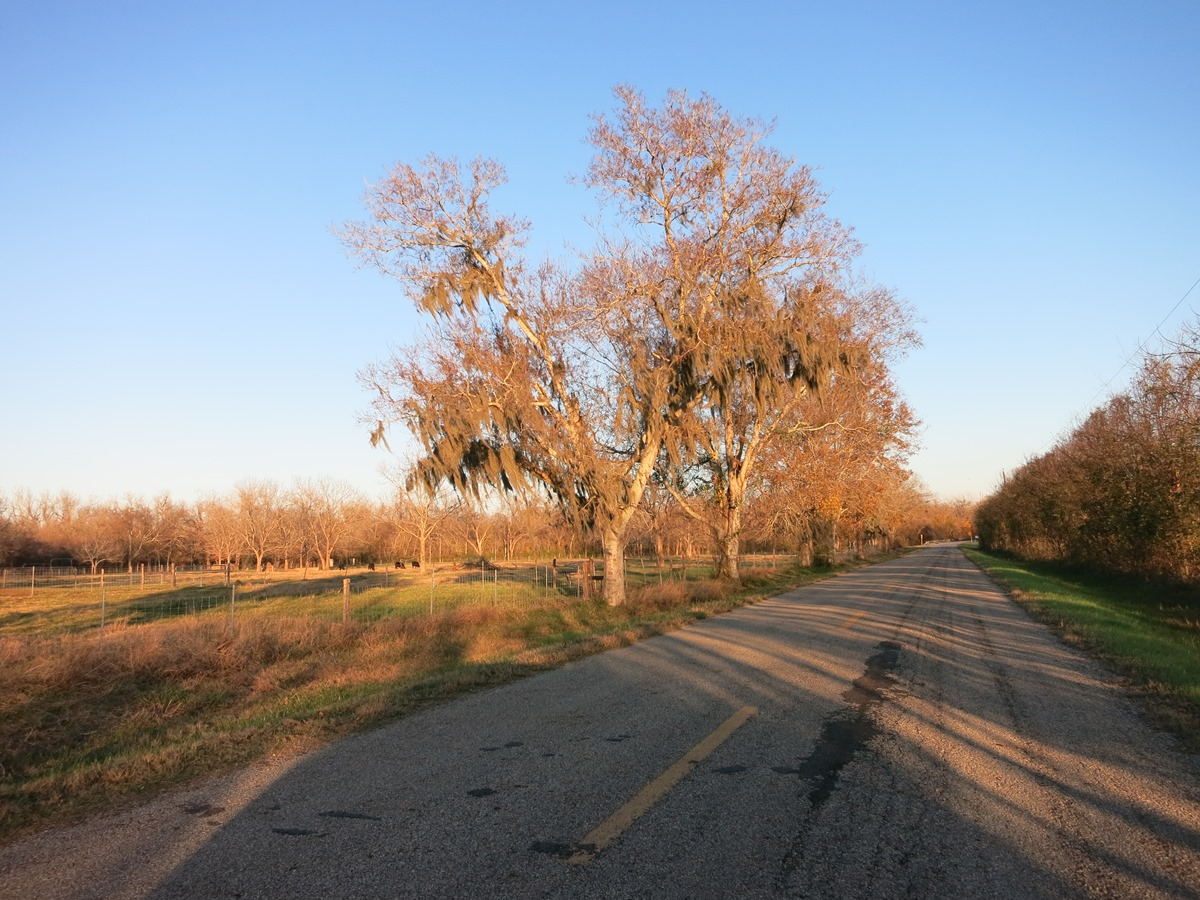
There are a few homes and pastures along County Road 42.

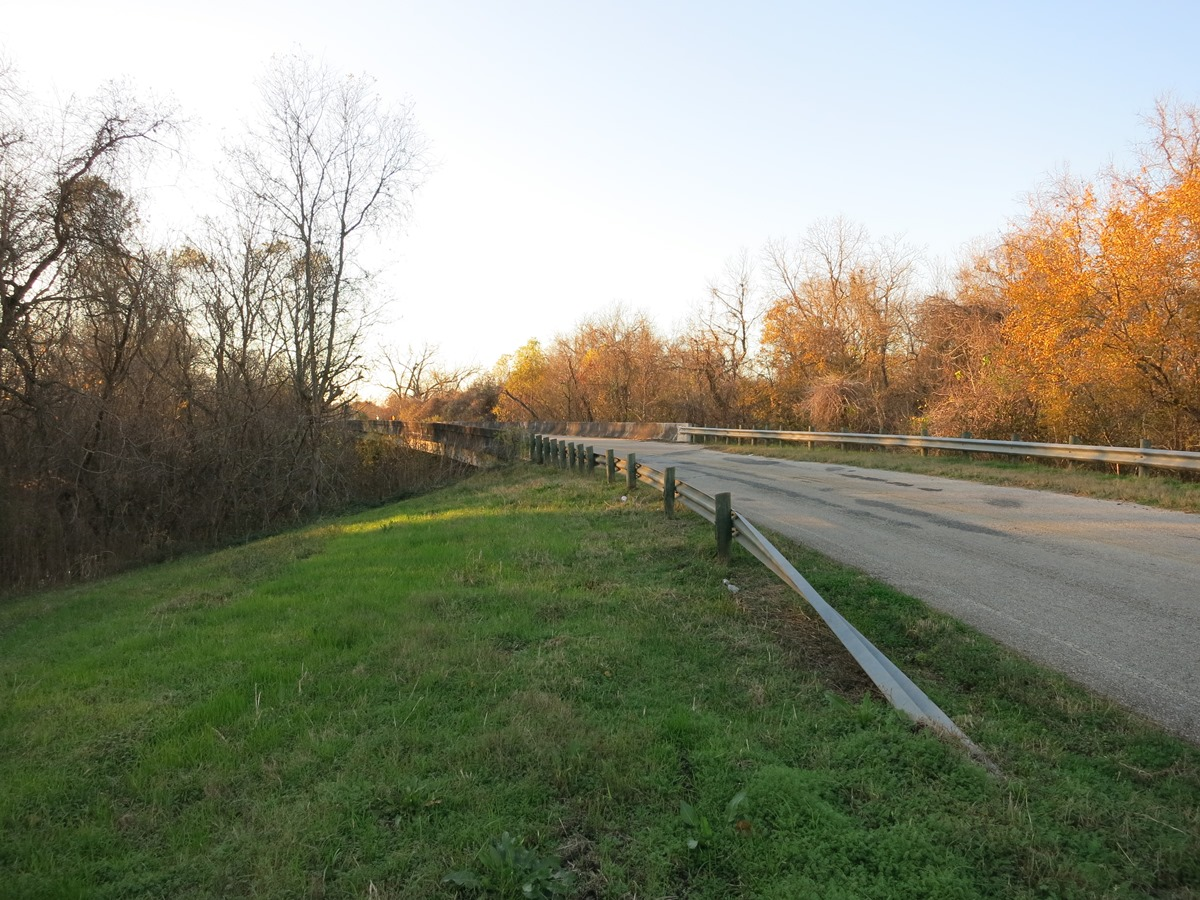
County Road 42 bridges Oyster Creek at English.

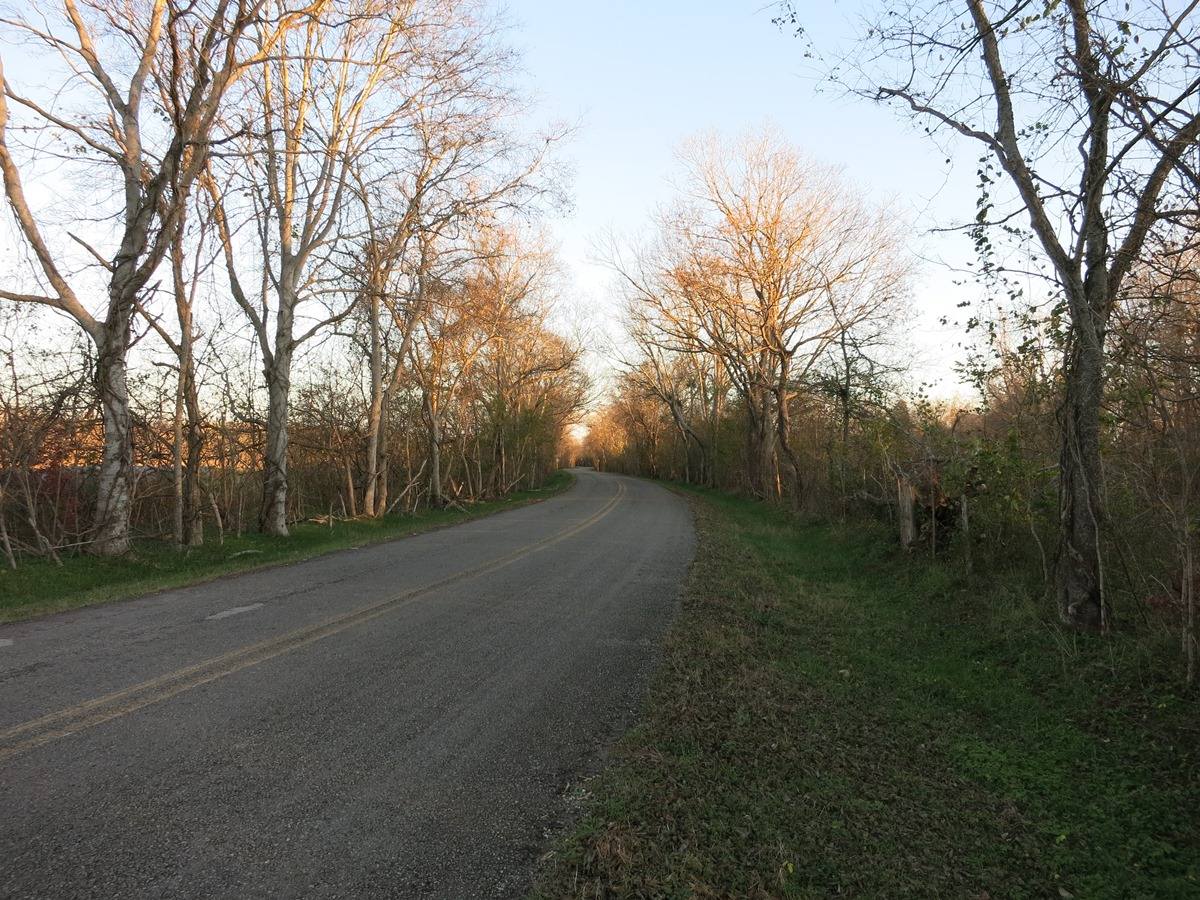
Tree-lined County Road 42 winds through the rural area.

== See also ==
- List of unincorporated communities in Texas
