= National Healthy Schools Programme =

British health initiative for schools

The National Healthy Schools Programme (NHSP) was a joint Department of Health and Department for Children, Schools and Families project intended to improve health, raise pupil achievement, improve social inclusion and encourage closer working between health and education providers in the United Kingdom.

The Programme started in 1998 and formed part of the strategy described in the Department for Children, Schools and Families' Children’s Plan (DCSF 2007) and in the Department of Health's Healthy Weight, healthy Lives (DH 2008).

It had four themes, each with its own criteria:

- Personal, Social and Health Education including sex and relationships and drugs education. These come under P.H.S.H. lessons for years 7, 8 and 9 and can be included in Religious studies classes. It provides young people with knowledge, understanding, skills and attitudes to make informed decisions about their lives.
- Healthy Eating includes healthy and nutritious foods being made in school canteens and available in schools as well as enabling young people to make informed decisions about healthy food.
- Physical Activity encourages young people to do physical activity as well as being given opportunities to be physically active. It helps understanding on how physical activity can make people healthier and can improve life as well as being part of it.
- Emotional Health and Well-being, including bullying, how to express feelings build confidence and emotional strength as well as supporting emotional health through counselors and chaplains. It is the promotion of positive emotional health and well-being.

The national programme ended in 2011 but some local governments created their own Healthy Schools schemes to continue similar work.

== National Healthy Schools Status ==
The National Healthy Schools Status was an award made under the scheme to schools which had achieved the four criteria.

The school underwent a self validation as follows:-

- School is briefed on the criteria and minimum standards expected.
- School completes a Needs analysis
- Local programme provides support.
- Once it believes it meets the criteria, the school sends in self-validation form signed off by the Head, a staff representative, a governor, a child/young person representative and a parent/carer.
- Quality Assurance Group accepts the school's submission unless it has reason to believe that the school has overlooked some aspect.
- The Local Programme changes database to record that the school has achieved National Healthy School Status
- The school is required to continue improving and is subject to further reviews.

The Government had set a target for all schools to work towards achieving National Healthy Schools Status, more than 97% were participating in the scheme and 75% achieved this by December 2009.

The system was created and designed technically by contractor Eugene Le Roux with 'systems' design input from National Healthy Schools Programme National Adviser Stuart G. Hall.
