= List of Garo characters =

This is a list of the various characters throughout the Japanese tokusatsu series Garo, not including the Horrors, a breed of demonic beings that make for most of the series antagonists.

== Garo the Golden Knight ==
The various holders of the title Garo the Golden Knight (黄金騎士・牙狼（ガロ）, Ōgon Kishi Garo) (Note: The kanji that make up the name "Garo" (牙狼) are literally translated as "Fanged Wolf".) are the main characters of the franchise, armed with the Garouken (牙狼剣, Garōken; Fanged Wolf Sword) blade. The Garo title, based on the word for "hope" in the old Makai language, is traditionally associated with the Saejima family. Garo's Madō Horse (魔導馬, Madōba), a horse-like Makai Beast (魔戒獣, Makaijū) familiar, is Gōten (轟天). (Note: The kanji that make up the name "Gōten" (轟天) are literally translated as "Roaring Heavens.")

The bearer of the Garo title is regarded to be the strongest Knight and is expected to be a role model for his peers. However, being the Golden Knight is not a formal ranking in itself and does not grant any preferential treatment or special privileges. For example, despite being from the prestigious Saejima family and being the Golden Knight, Kouga served for several years before being promoted to the Senate. Regardless, the title commands respect and reverence among most Makai practitioners. To be in the presence of the Golden Knight is often considered to be an honor and other Makai Knights tend to defer to him. The title's notoriety also extends to Horrors, especially those that are ancient enough to have faced Garo in the past. The title's prestige means that the Makai community generally has high expectations for the Golden Knight, and as such he is often summoned whenever unusually powerful Horrors or those of legendary status appear. The symbols of Garo, a golden circle containing a red triangle and the use of a red scabbard, are instantly recognizable to Makai practitioners.

Another Garo existed in an alternate universe where the last knight who donned it fought an impressive battle that forced him to release the armor's golden light, blackening and weakening it. After this battle, the armor was put on display in that world's Tower of Heroic Spirits (英霊の塔, Eirei no Tō) by Makai Priests. The armor eventually calls out to the priestess Hakana to restore its power. Hakana tries to perform a ritual to restore its radiance, only for the spell to be disrupted, creating the Madō Horrors that only her son Ryuga Dogai can kill as the new Golden Knight. Once the Madō Horrors are destroyed, the armor is fully restored and Ryuga is recognized as the true successor of the title of Garo.

In another alternate universe, the Garo armor has been without a holder for at least 20 years. Its most recent owner sacrificed his life to avert a dark calamity that strikes the world every 500 years. The armor ends up suspended high in the sky above the floating island of the Shidōin (士導院) training school for Makai Knights and Priests in the Demon World with the Garouken embedded in stone below. Makai practitioners in this era once pit 100 Knights-to-be in a ritualistic fight to the death, with the last man standing being given the right to attempt to draw the Garouken and claim the armor. The Garo armor from this timeline appears more technologically advanced, featuring glowing blue accents and a more futuristic appearance. It is also able to absorb the inner darkness of humans around it, converting the energy into a substance known as Dark Metal (ダークメタル, Dāku Metaru). Once it has fully absorbed enough darkness, the Dark Metal stored within the Garo armor becomes the powerful dark armor known as Veil.

=== Kouga Saejima ===
Kouga Saejima

Kouga Saejima (冴島 鋼牙, Saejima Kōga) is the Garo of the first two seasons, a very unsociable person who always keeps his feelings to himself and puts up a deadpan face all the time, yet possesses a noble and kind heart. Kouga was raised almost without friends during his childhood and surrounded almost exclusively by people with Makai backgrounds, as such brought up to think little else other than slaying Horrors. His father was the one who started his training at an early age and he still trains on a daily basis to sharpen his skills. Since childhood, originally having a naive view of the world, Kouga was raised by his father Taiga whom he respected despite him not to associate with anyone besides Jabi, Amon, and Gonza while hunting Horrors. But after causing his father's death by who he thought was a Horror, a devastated Kouga is assured by Zaruba as he convey Taiga's final thoughts: Take the title of Garo and to be brave. He is assigned to the Eastern Region at the start of the series.

To that end, wanting to master use of Soul Metal (ソウルメタル, Sōru Metaru), Kouga undergoes the path of becoming a Makai Knight like his father. Under the mandated alias of "Shiro" (シロ; White), which was placed so to protect the child's identity should he failed to graduate as a Makai Knight, Kouga befriended three other boys as they are all placed under the guidance of the Makai Knight Wataru. Though Kouga learned the value of friendship, he is forced to watch his friends being devoured by the Horror Raizon, keeping the beads they got from Wataru on his person in memory of them. Though he later trained under the Makai Knight Kengi, it still took over a decade since his father's death for Kouga to finally be strong enough to lift the Garouken from its resting place to become the current Golden Knight. By that time, Kouga reaches a conclusion of what he should fight for from his two teachers' ideal: one being that any person, good or bad, has not only the right to live, but also the potential to save many lives on their own in the process; the other being that one should try to his best to save another person, regardless of how slim the chances might be.

During the events of the first season, Garo meets Kaoru when he was slaying the Horror Anglay where she happened to be stained with Horror blood, a condition that will kill her in 100 days in an excruciatingly painful manner. Though expected to kill her to spare her a painful death, Kouga spared Kaoru's life because she reminded him of his mother. However, Kouga never told Kaoru about her situation and claimed to Zaruba and the Three Priestesses of the Eastern Watchdog that he kept her alive to be of use as a Horror bait. Eventually, saving Kaoru's life while falling in love with her, Kouga learns the truth of his father's death to be at the hands of the rogue Makai Knight Barago, who later kidnaps Kaoru to enact his plan to bring Messiah to the living world. While fighting a losing battle against he Priestesses' servant Kodama, who seemingly murdered Jabi, Kouga's refusal to discard his armor when the time limit was up caused his negative emotions to turn him into mindless Lost Soul Beast Garo (心滅獣身牙狼, Shinmetsu Jūshin Garo) while killing his opponent. After Zero saves him, Kouga battles Messiah and not only defeats her but Kiba as well, with the later at the cost of Zaruba. Some time later, Kouga is bidding an emotional farewell to Kaoru, as she would be heading to Italy to further her studies in art. She gave him the final product of her father's book with the last page painted, and Rei handed Kouga a restored Zaruba as a token of their friendship, which was reforged by the Western Watchdog. Though he still has his same old personality, he bears no past memories of his time with Taiga and Kouga, even stating that he didn't like the name Kouga gave him.

In Garo Special: Byakuya no Maju, Kouga was approached by Rin Yamagatana who delivered a message from Priest Amon. Kouga didn't believe her at first, but her mentioning their unfinished Barchess (バルチャス, Baruchasu) game persuaded him to take her seriously. Amon would return as a spirit to ask for his help to save Jabi's still-living body. Accepting the mission, despite interference from the resident Makai Knight Dan, Kouga enters the Makai Forest and battles the Makai Tree to regain Jabi. Soon after, Kouga receives new orders to contain the threat of the Horror Legules, managing to use the Phosphorus Arrow (鷹麟の矢, Ōrin no Ya) to destroy the fiend and his extensions. Soon after, Kouga returned home to find Kaoru painting in the backyard. They welcomed each other, clasped hands and walked back home, implying that they had finally confessed their feelings for each other. In Garo: Red Requiem, on orders to destroy the Apostle Horror Karma, Kouga meets Kengi's daughter Rekka and helps her reach the same conclusion her father pointed him to years ago, as they work together to destroy the Horror. Parting, Rekka gives Kouga one of her young Demon World Dragons, which Zaruba names "Kaoru" to Kouga's chagrin, that Kouga uses to search for Horrors while doubling as a messenger.

In Garo: Makai Senki, Kouga gets promoted from his post in the northern region to serve the Senate for defeating the Apostle Horrors. But just after fighting the Horror Cigarein, Kouga is attacked by a mysterious red-masked man, who engraves a Seal of Destruction onto him. As a result, Kouga does not have much time to live and his life shortens every time he dons his armor, as well as suffering chest pains from time to time and his body gradually weakens over time. Hiding his condition from Kaoru, Kouga continues his duties as he investigate red-masked man before learning of his identity as Sigma Fudō whose plan to end the Horror menace with the power of Gyanon nearly sends the world into chaos. Though he defeats Sigma, revealed to be one of the friends thought to be devoured by Raizon, Kouga had to leave to honor the contract he made to Gajari to achieve his victory by traveling to the Promised Land (約束の地, Yakusoku no Chi) to retrieve the Fang of Sorrow during the events of Garo: Soukoku no Maryu.

Prior of the events of Garo: Makai no Hana, Kouga marries Kaoru and fathers a son, Raiga, but presumed dead after pursuing Kaoru into a vortex. However, during Raiga's inheritance ceremony, it is revealed that Kouga is still alive, fighting elsewhere in another world, and has relinquished his title as the Golden Knight so that his son may take up the role in his absence.

Kouga returns in Garo: Makai Retsuden where he saves the time displaced Rekka and Rian and defeats Zaji once again. He heals Rekka's wounds and reveals to Rian that he is currently lost between dimensions and isn't physically with the two. Before he departs, he asks Rian to tell Rekka that he'll be back.

By the time of Garo: Gekkou no Tabibito and its mini-series prequel, Kaoru and Kouga finally reunite somewhere at Promised Land, but the-then animated Kiba Armor unexpectedly appears, possessed by Barago's surviving evil qi. It was after seemingly defeated Kiba she and her husband discovered that not only Eyrith being the one who separated her from her family, but also their son fight a losing battle against the legendary Horror, thus necessitating Kouga to send Zaruba to his son to aide him to become the next Garo. Kouga also revealed to have visited Tower of Heroic Spirits prior to his departure during which he learned that Raiga will form a deal with Gajari where the price would be carrying out the quest to mend all cracks of time and space Eyrith created one day, a quest he willingly take on his son's stead as well as how be found Kaoru to begin with. Upon learning that the recovered Kiba is after his son and possessed the late Shiroku to do so, he enlists aid from Taiga who soon assumed his pre-teenager form and alter-ego Baderu to prevent him from falling into their enemy's trap. Though the endeavor failed, the father and son reunited nevertheless shortly after Raiga overcomes Shiroku's trap in which Kouga tells the latter about his situation before being separated once again. Continuing their battle at Shiroku's fortress above the Tower of Heroic Spirits, Kouga is shocked to see his enemy's true identity and about to lose his ground until Raiga and Taiga appears to even the odds. Even so, Kiba soon turned the tide of the battle by combining his armor with Ouga that stored in the Tower by channeling heroic spirits he defeated only for the three generations of Garo bearers undo the upgrade and defeated him once and for all thanks to Mayuri and Kaoru sending them the Garo armor purified with their feelings of love and support. After the battle, Kouga departed to continue his mission, but not before reassuring his son that he will be back as he did 20 years prior.

As Garo, his armor helps protect him from damaging blows, but his armor isn't unbreakable. If a Horror is strong enough, they can damage and injure Kouga. Should the armor be exposed to a very powerful blow the armor will retract before the 99.9-second time limit. With the Garouken, transformed from Kouga's Makai Sword (魔戒剣, Makaiken), Garo can cut down almost anything and only a rare few Horrors are strong enough to resist its force. Kouga is able to use a technique called Blazing Armament (烈火炎装, Rekka Ensō). This is when he uses the Madō Fire (魔導火, Madōbi) from his Madō Lighter to encompass his sword and his armor to increase his damage potential. In some episodes, he's able to use Blazing Armament without the use of the Madō Lighter. When riding Gōten, his combat strength is increased with his Garouken transformed into the larger Garou Zanbaken (牙狼斬馬剣, Garō Zanbaken; Fanged-Wolf Horse-Slaying Sword) and the Dai Garou Zanbaken (大牙狼斬馬剣, Dai Garō Zanbaken; Big Fanged-Wolf Horse-Slaying Sword), the twice-sized Garou Zanbaken. Because his armor is composed of Soul Metal, the armor reacts to his will along with Madō Fire. The eyes of Kouga's Garo armor are green.

Kouga also received numerous powered-up forms in his many epic battles as Garo. During the fight with Messiah, the power within Kaoru's positive energy-based painting enabled Garo to become the angelic Winged Garo (翼人牙狼, Tsubasabito Garo). Then, while fighting Legules, Garo uses the Phosphorus Arrow to negate the Horror's influence while turning into Phosphorus Garo (鷹麟牙狼, Ōrin Garo). And then, while fighting Karma, Garo becomes Dragon Formation Garo (竜陣牙狼, Ryūjin Garo) through the souls of the many Makai Knights she devoured over the years. While fighting Judam, Garo becomes Blue Dragon Garo (蒼竜牙狼, Sōryū Garo) through the energies within Kakashi's heart.

Kouga Saejima is portrayed by Ryosei Konishi (小西 遼生, Konishi Ryōsei). As a child, he is portrayed by Ryusei Sawahata (澤畠 流星, Sawahata Ryūsei). As a 2-year-old, he is portrayed by Shuhei Jojo (城定 修平, Jōjō Shūhei).

=== Taiga Saejima ===
Taiga Saejima (冴島 大河, Saejima Taiga) is Kouga's father and the previous Garo. He died battling his former student Barago when Kouga was a boy. Seen only in flashbacks. The eyes of his Garo armor are red.

During the events of Garo: Gekkou no Tabibito, he was in his teenage form, under the alias of Baderu (バデル), until he regained his adult form during the final battle with Kiba. The name "Baderu" means "father" in the old Makai language.

Taiga Saejima is portrayed by Hiroyuki Watanabe (渡辺 裕之, Watanabe Hiroyuki). As Baderu, he is portrayed by Taishi Sato (佐藤 大志, Satō Taishi). As a 22-year-old, he is portrayed by Shoichiro Kitada (北田 祥一郎, Kitada Shōichirō). As a child, he is portrayed by Towa Watanabe (渡邉 斗翔, Watanabe Towa).

=== Ryuga Dougai ===
Ryuga Dougai (道外 流牙, Dōgai Ryūga) is the current Garo from an alternate universe parallel to that of Saejimas as of the events of Garo: Yami o Terasu Mono. Unlike usual Knights where armors are passed on from father to son or master to apprentice, the Garo armor was placed in the Tower of Heroic Spirits, and according to a caretaker monk, tarnished black after fighting a great battle long ago. Unlike his predecessors, Ryuga exudes a wild and imposing personality with a lack of respect for authority while he is actually kind and positive with a need to protect others, as well as an idiot who does not give up regardless of the odds stacking against him. Unlike the Golden Knights of the Saejima line, while he is brought up to be a formidable fighter, he is not as well educated and he is not proficient at all with the Makai language. He possesses the innate ability to hear people's feelings and thoughts by putting their belongings next to his ears. He uses the uncanny trait, inherited from his mother, as a means of sensing the presence of Horrors at times as well. Growing up as a child on an isolated island, he had always been fascinated with the Garo armor since his visit to the Tower of Heroic Spirits as a child, and promised his mother Hakana that he would be its wearer someday. Ryuga trained under Burai's instruction on the island for ten years with Ragō as his training partner before gaining the right to bear the Garo title. The eyes of his purified Garo armor are orange, though they are green while the armor is blackened. The armor also takes on a more fierce and somewhat sinister appearance before being purified, a weaker form known as the "Lost Shine" Garo (referred to as simply Garo Ryuga Version (牙狼流牙ver.) in merchandise). In Garo: Goldstorm Sho, Ryuga's Garo armor adopts an appearance similar to that of the "Lost Shine" Garo, albeit completely golden with orange eyes and somewhat different features, a form referred to as Garo Flight (牙狼翔, Garo Shō). The Garo Flight form is obtained after Ryuga temporarily lends the armor to the Makai Priestess Ryume for purification. What makes Garo Flight different from Garo's normal form other than appearance is unknown. Later, after facing his doubts while imprisoned in the Demon Mirror, Ryuga absorbs his inner darkness given form by the mirror to become Garo Dark (牙狼闇, Garo On), which combines Ryuga's light and darkness to blacken the Garo Flight armor in a similar fashion to the "Lost Shine" state. The Garo Dark state displays a significant increase in power, able to match Jinga's Horror form in strength, and is able to fly using a bat wing-like cape. Ryuga later displays the ability to access the Garo Dark state at will by channeling both light and dark energies through the Garouken sword. Years later, during the events of Garo: Hagane o Tsugu Mono, Ryuga displays his mastery over his inner darkness by being able to assume the Garo Dark state immediately after donning his armor without needing to channel light and dark energies through his sword. While fighting Radan, Garo Flight assumes a giant form composed of countless particles of golden light energy known as Garo Gold Storm (牙狼ゴールドストーム, Garo Gōrudo Sutōmu).

Though he killed Ragō to complete his training, Ryuga takes his training partner's fang as a keepsake and began a life of solitude after being told that his mother died during his training, resenting the Makai Priest for not being able to protect his mother. Not stationed in one place like Makai Knights usually are, Ryuga travels across Japan's cities to slay Horrors and erecting crude tombs overlooking them in memory of his mother. Eventually, Ryuga is sent to Vol City (ボルシティ, Boru Shiti) where he is reunited with Burai and reluctantly agrees to help him and the other Makai Knights stationed there. Finding himself facing Madō Horrors, Ryuga sees visions of his mother whenever hit by golden shock waves and emitted by the Madō Horrors' wounds that cause the Garo armor to momentarily regain its golden appearance as brief as the pain associated with it. While learning that they are behind the Horror residence of Vol City, Ryuga unwittingly gives the Kaneshiro Group enough evidence of his actions to create propaganda portraying him as a serial killer, and placing a ¥300,000,000 bounty on his head. However, Ryuga resolves the matter by going through with a meticulously elaborated plan to confirm Rivera's identity as a Madō Horror, retrieve a piece of material off of her for developing a Madō Horror Detector while faking his death at the Vol TV station.

After his confrontation with Hyena, Ryuga makes a grave marker for his mother on the cliff overlooking the Vol City with Rian's help. Though his mind is racing with thoughts of Vol City and the mystery of his armor's connections to them, Ryuga reaches the conclusion that destroying the Madō Horrors is the only way to obtain answers. After the revelation that Tousei is responsible for the Horrors in Vol City, learning that he is human, Ryuga is once more portrayed as a terrorist along with the rest of his group. Though he evades Tousei's attempt to make him into a Madō Horror, Ryuga ends up being blinded by Sonshi with the Garouken thrown into the lobby of Tousei's office where it remained. Despite extremely unfavorable odds due to his blindness and placed in solitary confinement, Ryuga escapes the SG1 prison and with timely aid from his fellow Knights, retrieves the Garouken. Soon after, finally acknowledged by Zaruba as they form a contract, Ryuga is reunited with his mother and learns that she was used by Tousei to sire Madō Horrors who are revealed to hold her memories. After Hakana gives up her own eyesight to restore his, Ryuga races off to the Hill of Zedom's Arm to save Rian, and finally kill Enhou through the combined efforts of him and Rian. After killing Enhou, hearing the last trances of the woman's humanity through her necklace, Ryuga vows to never have another innocent be sired as a Madō Horror.

In a bid to stop Zedom's resurrection, the group head for the slowly crumbling Hill of Zedom's Head and Ryuga knows right from the start that Burai intends to sacrifice himself. He eventually thanks Burai for all the priest has done for him, before heading to fight Sonshi and defeating him with the aid of his friends. With the Garo armor finally regains its brilliance, forced to kill his mother to spare her from becoming a Horror, Ryuga battles Zedom. During the fight, as the Horror attempts to consume him, Ryuga tells Zedom that the eyes he gained from his mother are a symbol of hope and future before he and the Makai Knights destroy him. With Vol City saved, Ryuga parts ways with his friends to not only build a grave marker for his mother in the Makai Priest ruins, but also deal with Tousei since he is now a Horror. After Rian kills Tousei in his stead, Ryuga accepts her request for her to join him in his southward journey.

In the events of Garo: Kami no Kiba, Ryuga returns sporting his old gear, unlike his other two Makai Knight associates back in Vol City who sport entirely new sets of gear. Ryuga and Rian are given orders by Ryume to look into the Horror incidents happening recently, before becoming the third and last victim, after Aguri and Takeru, of Banbi's scheme of stealing Makai Knight armors to temporarily resurrect his dead lover and fallen Makai Knight, Judo Tenma, thus forcing him to inadvertently pursuing his original objectives for totally different reasons. In the midst of his investigation, Ryuga met his old, slain archenemy from Garo: Gold Storm Sho, Jinga, after Banbi got tricked into resurrecting Jinga instead of Judo. Ryuga, Rian, Aguri and Takeru pursue Jinga and Rinza as the Fang of God was being created and activated. He ultimately stops the full on activation of the Fang of God by slaying Jinga yet again, thus prevent the summoning of Messiah, the progenitor of Horrors, into the world.

During the events of Garo: Hagane o Tsugu Mono, Ryuga travels to Creacity alone after receiving a request from the Makai Priestess Mutsugi in order to investigate the Gate of Destruction (破滅ノ門, Hametsu no Mon), the oldest and largest Horror gate in the world, which Mutsugi believes is due to open soon. He has now become a far more stoic and mature individual, serving as something of leader to the more inexperienced Creacity team. At some point in the past, he met and trained with Godou Shirahane, also known as Zango the Light Slash Knight, who taught him the powerful Flash Sword Dance (閃光剣舞, Senkō Kenbu) technique and asked him to look after his son Souma should they ever meet. Ryuga's mastery of his own inner darkness allows him to perform the technique with ease as well as safely handle artifacts imbued with darkness. During the final battle with the Horror-possessed Mutsugi, Ryuga channels Garo's golden light and transforms it into darkness in order to use the Dark Flash Sword Dance (閃影剣舞, Sen'ei Kenbu) technique, which reverts the armor to the Garo Dark state. Unable to summon Garo in its unpurified state, Ryuga uses Igusu's sword to don a gray Hagane armor with orange eyes to perform a tandem Flash Sword Dance with Souma to reseal the Gate of Destruction. After paying his respects to his fallen allies, Ryuga leaves Creacity to find a way to purify the Garo armor so he can summon it once again.

During the events of Garo: Higashi no Kairou, Ryuga borrows a Makai Sword from the Armor Mound, a resting place for Makai Knight armors whose bearers died in battle. Using the borrowed blade causes Ryuga to don a Revenant Armor (亡者ノ鎧, Mōja no Yoroi). This armor resembles a Hagane with a fierce, demonic face and holds the lingering negative emotions of its deceased former bearer. As such, it moves on its own and resists Ryuga's attempts to control it until he exerts his will over it. Upon Ryuga's request, Rian imbues the Garo armor with the soul of the Revenant Armor.

Ryuga Dougai is portrayed by Wataru Kuriyama (栗山 航, Kuriyama Wataru). As a child, he is portrayed by Ritsu Ohashi (大橋 律, Ōhashi Ritsu).

=== Raiga Saejima ===
Raiga Saejima (冴島 雷牙, Saejima Raiga) is the holder of the title Garo during the events of Garo: Makai no Hana, assigned the Blue Region. He is the son of Kouga Saejima and Kaoru Mitsuki, who mysteriously disappeared when he was six and assumed they were dead. Regardless, Raiga continued training even in the absence of a mentor when he was young before Rei Suzumura took the boy out on his first night of Horror hunting. Unlike most children from Makai families who are decided from birth by their parents to walk the Makai path, Rei allowed Raiga to decide for himself if he wants to be a Makai Knight, who eventually decided to succeed his father as a Makai Knight and became the Silver Fang Knight's apprentice, after a passing a trial on the night before his birthday. Raiga eventually succeeds his father as the Golden Knight Garo, learning during the ceremony for his inheritance of the Garo armor that Kouga is still alive and fighting in another world. With his father's permission circumventing their ancestors' initial decision, Raiga is given the title and armor of the Golden Knight.

Raiga is more easy-going and sociable compared to his father, often quipped by Gonza that he would probably be the kindest Knight around. He was quite an accomplished fighter even at a young age, seen capable of pulling off tricky moves when he sparred with his would-be mentor. He has a sharp wit and is already quite perceptive at the age of ten, even with the lack of formal tutelage. Under the later tutelage of Rei, Raiga fights in a noticeably different style that is more fluid and precise, yet flashy and less aggressive. His swordsmanship also surpasses that his father's, capable of drawing and sheathing his blade repeatedly in stylish manners without looking, even during battle. He is seen often fighting with both his sword and scabbard, an influence from Rei's dual-wield fighting style. Unlike his father, he prefers to toy around with his opponent barehanded before drawing his blade if the situation is not serious enough, and even after doing so, prefers to remain defensive and gauge his opponent before going into offense. He is usually a gentle person and rarely gets angry about anything, be it in or out of battle. However, when he does get angry in battle, his fighting style changes dramatically, where subtlety is non-existent and moves are heavy-handed and straightforward with a single-minded intention to pummel his opponent. While the Garo armor he dons is the one donned by all Golden Knights who came before him, Raiga can however use unconventional features of the armor, such as conjure flames from the armor at will and use harpoon blades at the back of the armor. The eyes of his armor are blue. While fighting Eyrith, Garo becomes Light Awakening Beast Garo (光覚獣身牙狼, Kōkaku Jūshin Garo) after taking control of his armor even after it possesses his body once the time limit expired.

During his fight with Zaji, he earned the right to summon Gōten despite not having undergone the same trial as his father. The reason of such, as stated by the spirit of Garo, is that by fighting Zaji, he is essentially fighting his own darkness.

Like his mother, he smiles a lot and is interested in drawing. However, based on Mayuri's comments on his artwork, he might not have inherited Kaoru's talent as well.

Raiga Saejima is portrayed by Masei Nakayama (中山 麻聖, Nakayama Masei). As a child, he is portrayed by Futo Takahashi (高橋 楓翔, Takahashi Fūto) in Garo: Makai no Hana and Keito Sugizono (杉園 啓仁, Sugizono Keito) in Garo: Ashura.

=== Gouki ===
Gouki (ゴウキ, Gōki) is the holder of the Garo title during the events of Garo: Ashura, a story that takes place in the distant past and predates the creation of Madōgu like Zaruba. Unlike modern holders of the title, who wield a smaller jian-like sword when unarmored, Gouki's Makai Sword is a large chunk of roughly-shaped Soul Metal about the same size as the Garouken sword in his armored form. Empowered by the feelings of his new friends Ren, Shin, and Taku during a battle with the powerful Horror Zarugin, Gouki's armor takes on the winged Heavenly Flying Garo (天翔牙狼, Tenshō Garo), allowing him to defeat the Horror with a powerful High Fly Flow from the sky. The eyes of his Garo armor are silver.

Gouki is portrayed by Hiroshi Tanahashi (棚橋 弘至, Tanahashi Hiroshi).

=== Sena Kuon ===
Sena Kuon (空遠 世那, Kuon Sena) is an ordinary university student and the main protagonist of Garo: Versus Road. He learns boxing as a hobby. His weapon of choice within the game is a silver longsword with a red gem in the hilt, based on a keychain he owned as a child that served as a symbol of his friendship with Hoshiai. He ultimately becomes the winner of the death game. During the fight with Hagiri donning the Veil armor, the heroic spirits allow Kuon to don the Garo armor before he manages to defeat the antagonist. After Azami kills Hagiri and leaves, Kuon leaves the Garouken to return to his normal life because he does not intend to become a Makai Knight.

Sena Kuon is portrayed by Koya Matsudai (松大 航也, Matsudai Kōya). As a child, he is portrayed by Haruto Tasaki (田崎 陽大, Tasaki Haruto).

== Makai Knights ==
The Makai Knights (魔戒騎士, Makai Kishi) are the primary elite fighting force of the Makai community and formed for one specific purpose only: to hunt down Horrors. Though there are many Makai Knight titles, each with its own unique armor and legacy, the bulk of the Makai Knight ranks consists of titleless Knights who are known as Hagane (鋼（ハガネ）), (Note: Hagane (鋼) is the Japanese word for "Steel".) which also refers to the standard-issue Makai armor they don.

=== Rei Suzumura ===
Rei Suzumura/Zero The Silver Fanged Knight

Rei Suzumura (涼邑 零, Suzumura Rei), also known as Zero the Silver Fanged Knight (銀牙騎士・絶狼（ゼロ）, Ginga Kishi Zero), (Note: The kanji that make up the name "Zero" (絶狼) are literally translated as "Cutting Wolf".) is a rival turned anti-heroic ally of the series and the Silver Makai Knight of the West. He was an orphan named Ginga (銀牙) before he was found by Douji, who took pity on him and raised Rei as his son to inherit his position as a knight of the West and start his own lineage. Though trained as a Makai Knight, Rei didn't have the tenacity or murderous intent to be a true warrior. One fateful night, however, Shizuka and Douji were both killed by a warrior who suspiciously resembled the Golden Knight. After giving his dead loved ones proper burials, he renamed himself Rei, putting his old name before his Knight title, and naming his armor "Zero", with both names being a pun on "Zero", with intention to reinvent himself as well as to get back at the Makai Knight that took his loved ones away, becoming a person full of angst, wild and murderous.

During Zero's quest for revenge he violated a host of protocols expected of a Makai Knight, from leaving his western territory post to directly attack Kouga. Though his investigations lead him to Kouga, Zero wasn't sure if Kouga was actually the knight that had murdered his family, thus he remained constantly uncooperative with the Golden Knight and even started fights with him to vent out his anger. Later in the series, the Watchdogs of the East try to frame Kouga for his family's death; Zero would later discover the true killer was Barago and ally himself with Garo. As the truths of matters unfold, his personality drastically changed, becoming more like his old self. He became more relaxed and open, turning into a caring friend for Kouga as they now share the same enemy. Rei and Kouga later visited the Western Watchdog where they reported and were ordered to assassinate Barago and Gulm. Because of Zero's tall list of violations he wasn't allowed to participate in Kouga's mission, but Kouga argued on his behalf, saying that he need his power. Rei's suspension was relinquished and he joined Kouga in dealing with Barago and Gulm.

During Kouga's dark transformation, it was Zero who helped Kouga snap out of his darkness. Gulm tried to stop the duo from reaching Kiba and Kaoru, but Rei decided to stay behind to deal with her, allowing Kouga to press forward. She assumed Shizuka's form and tried to trick him. He soon saw through her illusion because the real Shizuka addressed Rei as Ginga, while the impostor constantly called him Zero. After a very difficult fight Zero almost died, but survived a mortal blow because Silva took the hit. After a losing fight against Gulm, he took the opportunity of her overconfident victory and killed her. After Kiba's defeat, Rei presented Kouga with a reforged Zaruba as proof of their friendship and remained in the Eastern district to protect it while Kouga went northward.

In Garo Special: Byakuya no Maju, Rei was assigned to help guard the upcoming Kantai ceremony from Horrors' attack. He saved Hyuga and Akatsuki, Tsubasa's disciples, from Karakuri Horrors. After aiding Kouga and Tsubasa in their fight against Legules, he returns to his district.

Rei resurfaces during the events of Garo: Makai Senki, having been afflicted with the Seal of Destruction and in a weakened state, though he acts unconcerned and continues his duties, much like Kouga himself. Although friendly and personable, Rei admits to Silva that he dislikes large groups, once turning down an invitation for dinner at the Saejima estate. Later, from his confrontation with Juzo Igari, Rei considers settling a few matters with Kouga over which of them is the strongest, which he does by the end of Garo: Soukoku no Maryu, although the outcome is unknown. He also meets an old friend named Misao Hoshikawa, forced to make her hate him by killing the Horror that possessed her mother's body.

Rei's personality and lifestyle are further explored in Zero: Black Blood. It is revealed that aside from past allies such as Kouga and Tsubasa, he has few friends and spends most of his time lazing around when he is not out hunting Horrors, with Silva being his only company most of the time. Despite being a friendly and laid-back person, he dislikes having to work with others, often running off to do his job alone regardless of his partners' opinions. He lives in a small apartment in a seemingly abandoned building, having few material possessions beyond his motorcycle. He is also revealed to have a strong sweet tooth, adding excessive amounts of sugar, cream, honey, or anything sweet in anything he eats or drinks. His sweet tooth tendencies annoy the bartender Bakura, who often tells him to just get ice cream instead of asking for more cream in cocktails.

An older Rei appears in Garo: Makai no Hana, becoming Raiga Saejima's mentor when the child was ten years old upon Kouga's request. He tested Raiga's martial skills and, confirming Raiga to be fit enough to begin training under his wing, took Raiga out the night before the child's birthday to go Horror hunting, to show the child what Horrors are like firsthand and confirmed Raiga's wish to walk the Makai path. After completing Raiga's training, he also departs on a journey like Kouga did, claiming to Gonza that they will eventually return home safely.

Zero wields a pair of short swords called the Ginrouken (銀狼剣, Ginrōken; Silver Wolf Swords). In their Makai Sword form, these are shorter versions of Kouga's Makai Sword, which he typically holds in a reverse grip by default, and oddly, around the guard instead of the hilt. When Zero dons his armor, the swords become curved scimitar-like blades. These can be locked together to form a larger crescent-shaped double-bladed boomerang called the Ginga Ginrouken (銀牙銀狼剣, Ginga Ginrōken; Silver Fanged Silver Wolf Sword). Zero's armor can launch hooked wires from the emblems on his chest near his shoulders, which he can use to snare opponents or anchor himself to surfaces. His Ginrouken in their Makai Sword form can similarly launch their blades from the hilt attached to wires. In Zero: Dragon Blood, Rei exceeds his armor's time limit and becomes Lost Soul Beast Zero (心滅獣身絶狼, Shinmetsu Jūshin Zero) during his final battle with Edel. The armor is further warped into dragon-like Lost Soul Dragon Zero (心滅竜絶狼, Shimetsu Ryū Zero) during the fight, becoming capable of flight. Zero's Madō Horse with the same name as Rei's real name, Ginga, (Note: The kanji that make up the name "Ginga" (銀牙) are literally translated as "Silver Fang.") is similar to Garo's Gōten, but with a blade attached to his head. Rei claims that he is immune to all poisons, though it is unclear if the trait is unique to him or if all Makai Knights possess a similar immunity.

Rei Suzumura is portrayed by Ray Fujita (藤田 玲, Fujita Rei).

=== Tsubasa Yamagatana ===
Tsubasa Yamagatana (山刀 翼, Yamagatana Tsubasa), also known as Dan the Midnight Sun Knight (白夜騎士・打無（ダン）, Byakuya Kishi Dan), (Note: The kanji that make up the name "Dan" (打無) are literally translated as "Strikeless".) is the White Makai Knight of Kantai (閑岱), introduced in Garo Special: Byakuya no Maju. The Yamagatana family is a family of Makai Priests, but he converted to a Makai Knight after his parents' death. His parents, both Makai Priests, died in combat with Horrors and thus takes it upon himself to oversee the well-being of his younger sister Rin. He is a strict and "by the book" type of guy, believing that emotions will only get in the way of his duties and that both a Makai Knight and those dear to him must be prepared for the former's demise. Tsubasa also has a pair of disciples, Hyuga and Akatsuki, under him. Not notified of Kouga's arrival to Kantai, Tsubasa confronts the Makai Knight after he defended his disciples and fight him before Garai intervened and told Tsubasa to let Kouga pass to carry out his mission to save Jabi. Tsubasa objected to what he thought was an act against natural order and originally saw Jabi as an abomination until she risked her life to save Rin. After he apologized to Jabi for his rudeness towards her, Tsubasa joins her with Kouga and Rei to defeat Legules in the Abyss Forest (奈落の森, Naraku no Mori). After Legules' defeat, Tsubasa told Rin that she's his pride and finally showed his smile when Rin performed magic to create butterflies.

During the events of Garo: Makai Senki, Tsubasa is revealed to have been marked with the Seal Destruction as well, his condition far worse than Kouga's and Rei's due to far more frequent summonings of his armor, suffering intense pain on his chest all the time. He intends to get rid of Wataru, assuming that he had fallen completely to darkness. Even when rectified by Hyuga and Kouga later, he stands his ground as he sees that to be the only way to free Wataru from his suffering. However, touched by Kouga's actions and thoughts of wanting to save the suffering knight from his inner darkness even though chances might be slim, he ended up helping Kouga save Wataru from himself nonetheless, allowing himself to be stabbed together with Wataru to pin Wataru down so as to purge the evil influence within Wataru's armor. Tsubasa assures Kouga that he has no intention of dying at the moment, and promises Kouga that he would not harbor the intentions of throwing his life away easily because of his condition as he did previously. In Garo: Makai Retsuden, it is shown that Tsubasa and Jabi frequently work together and it is implied that they share romantic feelings.

As a Makai Knight, other possessing great fighting skills and amazing speed, he possess traits unusual for a Makai Knight, wearing a jacket over his shirt and skirting on his lower body, which is more common with Makai Priests, rather than a duster like other Knights; he also augments magic into his fighting style through the use of his special earring. He wields a bō/spear called Makai Spear (魔戒槍, Makaisō) which has a spearhead tip that can extend out by section being twisted. Donning his Makai armor, the very aura it produces able to disintegrate a Horror, Dan is armed with the double-headed Midnight Sun Spear (白夜槍, Byakuyasō) and uses a purplish Madō Fire. Dan's Madō Horse is Hayate (疾風). (Note: Hayate (疾風) is the Japanese word for "Gale.")

Tsubasa Yamagatana is portrayed by Shouma Yamamoto (山本 匠馬, Yamamoto Shōma).

=== Hyuga and Akatsuki ===
Hyuga (日向, Hyūga) and Akatsuki (暁) are the disciples of Tsubasa who wear blue uniforms and wield Soul Metal swords. Hyuga is the calmer one compared to Akatsuki. His skills are weak compared to real Makai Knights, but brave in battle. Akatsuki comes off nervous amongst the two and often feels shamed when unable to fight well in battle; he and Hyuga will always face danger even if they are afraid. He has taken a liking towards Rei and wants to be his apprentice, but Rei feels he is better off alone with Silva.

In Garo: Makai Senki, Hyuga fights against evil Wataru, but is defeated easily.

Hyuga and Akatsuki are portrayed by Minoru Tomita (富田 稔, Tomita Minoru) and Noboru Yasunaga (安永 昇, Yasunaga Noboru) respectively.

=== Kengi ===
Kengi (剣義) is the father of Rekka who was murdered by the Horror Karma. He wielded a Chinese sword and had also trained Kouga in the past.

Kengi is portrayed by Kanji Tsuda (津田 寛治, Tsuda Kanji).

=== Bado the Storm Knight ===
Bado the Storm Knight (風雲騎士・波怒（バド）, Fūun Kishi Bado) (Note: The kanji that make up the name "Bado" (波怒) are literally translated as "Wave Anger".) is a Makai Knight of the West who battled Barago for several times in the past, believing that there is some good left in Barago's heart. Though eventually killed in battle, Bado attempted to give Barago a final chance of redemption by infusing some of his light into the Breaking Thunder (闘破雷撃, Tōha Raigeki) attack which dispersed and entered the villain's body. Like Zero, Bado's armor is silver and color and he wields a pair of short swords called the Fuunken (風雲剣, Fūunken; Storm Swords). Bado was a senior disciple of Zero.

Bado is voiced by Kazuhiko Inoue (井上 和彦, Inoue Kazuhiko).

=== Wataru Shijima ===
Wataru Shijima (四十万 ワタル, Shijima Wataru), also known as Baron the Thunder Knight (雷鳴騎士・破狼（バロン）, Raimei Kishi Baron), (Note: The kanji that make up the name "Baron" (破狼) are literally translated as "Breaking Wolf".) is a Makai Knight serving the Senate, donning a suit of azure armor similar in style to Bado's and wields the Raimeiken (雷鳴剣; Thunder Sword), a scimitar-like sword, in his armored form. As one of the Makai Knight instructors training young Makai Knights-to-be in his earlier days, Wataru gains infamy for his draconian yet effective methods. Despite his gruff demeanor, he actually cares deeply for his pupils. He considers the bloodline of a student's Makai Knight family to be of no importance, instead focusing on if the person in question has the strength to protect others, and that one should try his or her best even though chances might be slim. Wataru happened to have Kouga under his tutelage while a boy, playing a vital role in helping to foster the youth into who he is now. Sent on a mission to find the red-masked man, Wataru is ambushed by the villain as he marks him with the seal of destruction, causing his inner darkness to awaken. Being almost completely taken over by his dark side, Wataru is forced to attack his fellow Makai Knights as he attempts to keep himself at bay. He tried to kill himself to avoid being taken over completely by the darkness within him, only to be stopped by his evil side. Eventually, Kouga and Tsubasa manage to purge the evil influence from his armor and returning him to normal. While telling Kouga of the possible tension between the knights and the priests that can be caused by the Sigma Fudō's actions, Wataru recognizes him as his pupil. Wanting to return Kouga's favor of rescuing him earlier, he joins the final fight with Gyanon.

In Garo: Makai Retsuden, it is revealed that he has a dark sense of humor and enjoys toying with Horrors he hunts. Being sent on missions to wipe out small pockets of Horror communities, his modus operandi is to act as a bait to be captured and caged as livestock in their hideouts, later emerging and slaying the entire house when he deems the time is right. As these hideouts tend to be dilapidated bars, he usually also orders a drink from the Horror bartender after slaying all other Horrors, granting a quick death if the drink tastes good, and chopping up said bartender piece by piece if the drink tastes bad.

While not shown in the series, in the Makai Kessen Gaoh pachinko game, Baron has Shingetsu (震月). (Note: The kanji that make up the name "Shingetsu" (震月) are literally translated as "Quaking Moon")

Wataru Shijima is portrayed by Kenji Matsuda (松田 賢二, Matsuda Kenji).

=== Aguri Kusugami ===
Aguri Kusugami (楠神 哀空吏, Kusugami Aguri) is latest in his line to inherit the title of Gai the Sky Bow Knight (天弓騎士・牙射（ガイ）, Tenkyū Kishi Gai), (Note: The kanji that make up the name "Gai" (牙射) are literally translated as "Fanged Shooting".) who secretly worries that he cannot live up to his family's prestige. His family is known for skills in archery and as noted by Ryuga, being able shoot arrows continuously and rapidly is one of the basics of the Kusugami Style Archery Techniques. Although his combat skills lies predominantly in archery, like any other Knights, he is capable of fighting in closed quarters. As such, he wields a large bladed Makai Bow (魔戒弓, Makaikyū) which also serves as a closed quarter weapon. He does not see much in Ryuga and initially adopts a rather antagonistic attitude towards the newcomer. Cool-headed and standoffish, Aguri favors careful and meticulous planning over rushing into battles like the knights are usually known for, and he does not mind using unwilling people as bait if it means getting the job done. As such, despite being the brains of the group, he does not mingle well with the other two knights and often comes into clashes with them. After Takeru mellows down due to affection for Rui and Ryuga showing kindness over time, he gradually warms up to both of them. Despite seemingly stoic-looking, he is not devoid of compassion, shown during a mission in the Kaneshiro Foods Factory (which has a plant for packaging human souls into capsules) where he opts to trigger the emergency alarm to have the human staffs evacuated, despite the possibility of jeopardizing the mission due to SG1 arriving in minutes, after being shown the lives devastated in the harvesting of human souls. While he is shown earlier to be unable to shoot arrows capable of piercing through Madō Horrors, he eventually becomes skilled enough through rigorous training to be able to accomplish the feat.

After the disastrous mission and hearing of Ryuga prison break, he correctly predicts that Ryuga would head straight for the Garouken despite unfavorable odds. He promptly sets out to Ryuga's aid despite the group being in no shape to fight after their last ordeal. His bow is broken by Sonshi in the fight to help Ryuga get his sword back. The bow is repaired soon after, but is now capable of being separated in the middle and used as a nunchaku as well as a pair of swords. Aguri also receives a special arrowhead from Burai that enables him to further weaken Zedom during the final battle. Once Vol City is saved, Aguri parts ways with his friends to join the Senate. However, wanting to hone his skills further before going, Aguri takes over Rian's duty as Vol City's protector so she can travel with Ryuga.

In the events of Garo: Kami no Kiba, Aguri returns wielding a bow-styled Makai blade which can be transformed into a bō, using collapsible metal arrows, as well as wearing a black duster instead of his old blue one. Events of the movie unfold as he lends his armor to a childhood friend, Banbi, to temporarily resurrect her old fallen Makai Knight lover, Judo Tenma, only to have her running away with his armor and searching for more Makai Knight armors after finding out that one set is inadequate to perform the deed. Inadvertently roping in Takeru and Ryuga as their armors got taken from them forcibly by Banbi as well, he ultimately helps to stop the full on activation of the Fang of God, thus prevent the summoning of Messiah, the progenitor of Horrors, into the world. They part ways again after the ordeal.

Aguri Kusugami is portrayed by Tsunenori Aoki (青木 玄徳, Aoki Tsunenori).

=== Takeru Jakuzure ===
Takeru Jakuzure (蛇崩 猛竜, Jakuzure Takeru) is a laid-back, self-styled playboy who prefers going after girls over hunting Horrors. As Zen the Flame Sword Knight (炎刃騎士・漸（ゼン）, Enjin Kishi Zen), (Note: Zen (漸) is the Japanese word for "Steadily".) Takeru wields a liuyedao and although laid-back, he is nevertheless skilled in combat. Unlike Aguri, he takes an instant liking to Ryuga and finds him interesting, despite Ryuga being standoffish during their first meeting and seeing the rest of the gang as little more than nuisance. However, despite their rough introduction, both Ryuga and Takeru get along well quickly. His playboy attitude changes drastically after meeting Rui, as he abandons his womanizing ways completely and dedicates most of his time to look out for Rui, often seen hanging out at the flower shop where she works, prioritizing her over his duties as a Makai Knight. During the confrontation with Tousei, Takeru saves Ryuga from being turned into a Madō Horror with the Madō Horror Plant stabbed into his right hand. To prevent the roots from spreading and turning him into a Madō Horror, Takeru forcibly cuts off his infected right hand which he has Ryuga destroy. Although he falls into a depression soon after, Takeru regains his resolve and promptly sets out to Ryuga's aid with Aguri. He eventually gains a Soul Metal fist created by Burai to replace his lost hand, which can be turned into a shield at a moment's notice without having to summon his armor, although he has yet to develop fine control of the fist to enable him to use it as a normal hand, reducing his effectiveness with a blade somewhat, but still potent in battle nonetheless. Once Vol City is saved, Takeru parts ways with his friends and heads west. Meeting Rui one last time before leaving Vol City, Takeru vows to become a better man and be more serious.

In the events of Garo: Kami no Kiba, he wields a Bowie knife-styled Makai Sword which can be lengthened into a dao-like longsword, replaces his old red and black garb with an all-black one, and now has fine control over his Soul Metal Fist to use it as a regular normal hand. His hair has also lengthened considerably, yet he is still the same jokester who throws inappropriate, lewd jokes every so often. He got roped into the events of the movie after having his armor stolen by Banbi, and ultimately teams up with Ryuga, Rian and Aguri to stop the full on activation of Fang of God, preventing the summoning of Messiah, the progenitor of Horrors, into the world. They part ways again after the ordeal, but not before telling Ryuga and Rian to give him a call, should both of them made a baby.

Takeru Jakuzure is portrayed by Junya Ikeda (池田 純矢, Ikeda Jun'ya).

=== Crow the Phantom Knight ===
Crow the Phantom Knight (幻影騎士・吼狼（クロウ）, Gen'ei Kishi Kurō) (Note: The kanji that make up the name "Crow" (吼狼, Kurō) are literally translated as "Howling Wolf".) is a Shadowfolk Makai Knight who is serving in the White region and is sent to assist Raiga, as the museum where the slate was unraveled is within his jurisdiction. While he is also easy-going, unlike Raiga, he is rather aloof and rarely seen smiling. However, he respects status and authority, shown to apologize to Raiga immediately after learning the Golden Knight's identity for speaking in a cheeky manner earlier. He is armed with a ninjatō-styled Makai Sword and shuriken-like weapons called the Enzan (円参), which also serve as trackers and extensions for Horror detection with the help of Orva. His real name, if he even has one, is never revealed as, according to Orva, a Makai Knight who lives in the shadows does not need a true name. Like his title's namesake and black-ops image, Crow's armor is midnight blue in color and is less ornate than most Knights. While donning his armor, Crow wields the Geneiken (幻影剣; Phantom Sword). The most notable feature of Crow's armor is its capability of sprouting wings for flight, although he sacrifices twenty seconds of use of the armor to summon them. Due to the inherent risk of his armor lifting during aerial combat and causing him to fall to his death, he rarely uses this ability. The "wolf ears" on his helmet are capable of folding downwards to serve as a visor when in flight. His tasks are more strictly defined than most Makai Knights - locate and destroy Inga gates during the day and hunt Horrors at night without anyone's knowledge. Whether this is a self-defined role, the traditional role of the Phantom Knight, or a modus operandi shared by all Shadowfolks is currently unknown.

In Garo: Makai Retsuden, he is seen visiting his former mentor, Eiji, now imprisoned by the Makai Order for the crimes committed by releasing Eyrith. He pretended to ask for a duel to the death in the mental realm so as to face up to his weakness, and ended up defeating Eiji. In actuality however, that was just a ruse so that he can enter Eiji's mind and help cut down his former mentor's inner darkness. Despite all Eiji put him through during the events in Garo: Makai no Hana, he vows nonetheless to one day fight alongside Eiji again.

Crow is portrayed by Atomu Mizuishi (水石 亜飛夢, Mizuishi Atomu).

=== Daigo Akizuki ===
Daigo Akizuki (秋月 ダイゴ, Akizuki Daigo) is a Makai Knight who is also in charge of training young Makai Knights-to-be and holds the title of a Guide (導師, Dōshi). He is a proud, stoic, cautious person who always properly weighs odds before doing something. Daigo holds the belief that Makai Knights should be more mindful and protective of their own lives and weapons, as their blades are tied to their lives, which are tied to the protection and salvation of innocent lives—a belief he teaches to all his students. His teaching methods are also fairly harsh and he will not hesitate to criticize and scold his students for minor mistakes, especially dropping or mishandling one's sword. Unlike many Makai Knights shown throughout the series who care little for their own social status, Daigo puts a lot of weight in seniority, rank and authority, both his and that of others. He also tends to address people with their surnames instead of given names, an uncharacteristic trait within the Makai Order. As such, he refuses to "take orders" from his juniors unless absolutely necessary and demands respect and tact from those he deems lower than himself, only regarding someone if they address him with the proper decorum befitting his position. Ryuga, known for his recklessness and general disregard for authority, is a complete antithesis to Daigo. As such, Daigo is very disapproving of Ryuga's methods and way of life, while Ryuga finds his imposing presence irritating, thus resulting in their relationship being an uneasy one. Daigo also holds some distaste for Gald, as the boy's rude, informal, and disdainful attitude, especially towards Makai Knights, infuriates him. Despite his distaste for Gald, Daigo eventually develops a soft spot for Haruna, going as far as to keep an eye on her as a gym teacher at her school when she decides to temporarily enter normal life in Garo: Makai Retsuden.

In battle, Daigo wields a Makai Axe (魔戒斧, Makaifu). As Giga the Beast Knight (獣身騎士・戯牙（ギガ）, Jūshin Kishi Giga), (Note: The kanji that make up the name "Giga" (戯牙) are literally translated as "Frolic Fang".) Daigo dons a suit of bulky green armor with bestial characteristics and wields the two-handed Jushinfu (獣身斧, Jūshinfu; Beast Axe) that he uses to unleash devastating blows, capable of killing dozens of low-level Horrors in one swing. He is also equipped with a large claw weapon mounted on the left arm, which he uses when his axe is otherwise unavailable. Daigo also displays the ability to grow the Jushinfu to a great size and propel himself forwards to unleash a powerful charging attack.

Daigo Akizuki is portrayed by Tomohito Wakizaki (脇崎 智史, Wakizaki Tomohito).

=== Jinga Mikage ===
Jinga Mikage (御影 神牙, Mikage Jinga) is a Makai Knight and the protagonist of Kami no Kiba: Jinga. Mikage is actually the reincarnation of Ryuga Dougai's nemesis, a fallen Makai Knight-turned-Horror named Jinga who was destroyed by the Horror Messiah when he challenged her. He was born within the Mikage family and became an established Knight at a fairly young age, forced to kill his own father after he was possessed by a Horror and killed his mother. Mikage is since haunted by the event, his Makai Priestess partner Fuusa noticing his emotional trauma when it comes to the subjects of family and parents. Despite often sporting a tired nonchalant look, Mikage is faithful and caring towards Toma and Fusa in his own way while taking an aloof and indifferent approach to just about anyone or anything outside of slaying Horrors. But he is shown to have faith in humanity as he believes no human is destined to become a Horror, no matter how evil they might be. Following his mission of slaying the Horror Cadena, his right hand is bitten by the Horror with a slow healing wound noted by Toma to look like a wolf's fang, Mikage inexplicably gains the unprecedented ability of seemingly exorcising Horrors from their human hosts at the cost of being unable to seal a Horror's essence in his blade.

Soon after, Mikage develops a strange feeling of being watched as a strange butterfly remained by his side during one unusual night when a large group of Horrors appear in multiple places. He meets Rozan and Shijo, who were tracking him down after learning of his powers. While their meeting proceeds amicably, the dark Jinga of his past life briefly manifests himself and killed Shijo in secret with Rozan keeping an eye on Mikage. Soon after, Jinga becomes haunted by his past self who chastises him for keeping to the Makai Knight mission and avoiding the darker aspects that his powers offer. The resulting battle from the 'introduction' ends inconclusively, with Jinga deciding to fall back to the shadows for now and observe his reincarnated self's actions while influencing him to murder Kaname and his son Subaru under the pretense of requesting a friendly match.

In time, Mikage's abilities cause him to develop a messiah complex and paranoia that result with him going on the run when Kerus requests him to submit himself for further inspection of his powers, joined by Toma and Fusa before the former turned himself in. Mikage also murdered Fusa when she attempted to talk him into surrendering himself at Toma's behest. Mikage is then confronted by Jinga, who reveals the truth of their power——it only suppresses the possessing Horrors rather than exorcizing them. Mikage refuses to accept the truth that he had endangered more lives than saved until he is attacked by a furious Toma who consciously awakened his Horror form. This revelation destroys Mikage, rendering him despondent as Jinga metaphysically kills him off to complete his resurrection.

As Roze the Glittering Shadow Knight (影煌騎士・狼是（ローゼ）, Eikō Kishi Rōze), (Note: The kanji that make up the name "Roze" (狼是, Rōze) are literally translated as "Wolf Justice".) Mikage dons a set of steel-gray and crimson armor that resembles his past life's Horror form, which itself has been a corruption of his original armor. In his armored form, he wields a jian-like blade and specializes in rapid, aggressive attacks.

Jinga Mikage is portrayed by Masahiro Inoue (井上 正大, Inoue Masahiro). As a child, he is portrayed by Sora Higuchi (樋口 天翔, Higuchi Sora).

=== Mizuto Mikage ===
Mizuto Mikage (御影 瑞人, Mikage Mizuto) is a Makai Knight and the patriarch of the Mikage family, presumably an esteemed family within the Makai community, as well as Jinga and Toma's father. Half a year before the events of Kami no Kiba: Jinga unfolded, Amily forced his transformation into a Horror to begin her plan to resurrect the original Jinga. As a Horror, Mizuto killed his wife in front of Jinga, forcing the young Makai Knight to cut him down despite Toma's protests, leaving both Mikage sons with lingering trauma that served as an opening for the original Jinga to start reawakening.

Mizuto Mikage is portrayed by Toru Kazama (風間 トオル, Kazama Tōru).

=== Rozan ===
Rozan (狼斬) is a veteran Makai Knight who comes from a family of Makai Knights. He is one of the few knights who wield polearms, in his case, a spear, instead of a sword. He is tasked to investigate the rumors of a Makai Knight capable of exorcising Horrors from humans, taking Shijo, a subordinate of his along. He is shown to be a strict, no-nonsense person, exuding an intimidating and imposing aura. However, he is open-minded and cares about humanity, shown as how unlike Shijo who is insistent that such a feat cannot be accomplished, Rozan opts to keep an open mind and consider the possibility of such a person existing, however unlikely it may be, often quipping that how such a feat will change the Makai community for the better. He is experienced investigator and sports a sharp wit, capable of taking minute clues out of scenes of battle and deducing what took place there vividly, allowing him to create a rough profile of Jinga before meeting the rumored Knight in person. While pleased to actually meeting Jinga and confirming the rumored Knight's never-before-heard-nor-seen abilities, he remains cautious of the possible harmful or unwanted effects of such an ability, electing to keep Shijo around Jinga to keep an eye out on things.

Rozan is portrayed by Koh Takasugi (高杉 亘, Takasugi Kō).

=== Souma Shirahane ===
Souma Shirahane (白羽 創磨, Shirahane Sōma) is a young Hagane in charge of Creacity (クレアシティ, Kureashiti) and the son of Godou Shirahane, the Makai Knight known as Zango the Light Slash Knight. Souma is initially arrogant, quick to anger, and highly confrontational, boasting that the presence of Ryuga and the Three Swordsmen of Agora is unnecessary and he can protect Creacity on his own. Because his father's title is seen as being near or equal to Garo the Golden Knight in terms of prestige, Souma holds resentment for being a "mere" Hagane and will lash out at anyone who suggests that titled Knights are better than Hagane. He is driven by a desire to prove himself as a strong and capable Makai Knight who can live up to his father's legacy, which is the source of his attitude problems and unwillingness to work with others. Despite his father being missing for three years without a trace, Souma is insistent that he will return someday and becomes defensive whenever anyone suggests otherwise. His hotheaded nature cools considerably after Ryuga acknowledges his insecurities and encourages him to find the answers he is looking for through his duties as a Makai Knight. Though he practices regularly, he has yet to master the Flash Sword Dance technique his father developed due to being unable to tame his inner darkness, once being consumed by it during a practice session and blindly attacking his father. His volatile nature and insecurities also make him more susceptible to being influenced by darkness overall. Despite Souma's flaws, Godou had much faith in him as a Makai Knight and declared him worthy of inheriting the Zango armor. During the final battle with Mutsugi, now possessed by the Seducer, Souma conquers his inner darkness and is able to successfully perform the Flash Sword Dance alongside Ryuga and accompanied by the spirit of his father to reseal the Gate of Destruction. After paying respects to his father and fallen allies, Souma, with Ryuga's encouragement, resumes his duties as Creacity's assigned Makai Knight, proudly declaring himself and his companions "the ones who inherit steel."

As a titleless Makai Knight, Souma dons a gray Hagane armor with blue eyes. Souma displays the ability to use the armor's oni face decoration on its back as a pair of grappling lines, which is a standard feature of the Hagane.

Souma Shirahane is portrayed by On Nakano (仲野 温, Nakano On).

=== Three Swordsmen of Agora ===
The Three Swordsmen of Agora (アゴラの三剣士, Agora no San Kenshi) are a trio of Hagane composed of Igusu (イグス) and his disciples Ron (ロン) and Obi (オビ) and are in charge of the areas around Creacity.

Igusu takes great pride in being a Hagane, as they were the first Makai Knights and the backbone of the Order, and instills the same values on his subordinates. It is for this reason he questions Souma's worthiness to be a Makai Knight, finding the young man's arrogance and lack of respect for his role insulting to Hagane both past and present. Igusu is mortally wounded and devoured by the Horror Gaera when he defends Obi from an attack. Souma later gives Igusu's sword to Ryuga when the Garo armor is corrupted, allowing Ryuga to summon his own Hagane armor in order to approach and reseal the Gate of Destruction. Igusu's spirit is seen one final time acknowledging Souma and Ryuga after their victory.

Ron is said to be highly skilled despite his laid-back personality and is recognized as having great potential, being Igusu's first choice to replace Souma as Creacity's Makai Knight when Souma's behavior starts becoming a liability.

Noted to be the most inexperienced of the three, Obi idolizes and reveres Ryuga as the Golden Knight despite Ryuga's insistence that they are equals.

When the team consisting of Ryuga, Souma, Koyori, and Mutsugi travel to the Gate of Destruction, Creacity is left in Ron and Obi's care.

As titleless Makai Knights, Igusu, Ron, and Obi don gray Hagane armors with red, green, and yellow eyes respectively.

Igusu, Ron, and Obi are portrayed by Kentez Asaka (朝香 賢徹, Asaka Kentetsu), Akihiro Yamamoto (山本 章博, Yamamoto Akihiro), and Shun Nishime (西銘 駿, Nishime Shun) respectively.

=== Godou Shirahane ===
Godou Shirahane (白羽 ゴドウ, Shirahane Godō), also known as Zango the Light Slash Knight (光斬騎士・斬冴（ザンゴ）, Kōzan Kishi Zango), (Note: The kanji that make up the name "Zango" (斬冴) are literally translated as "Slashing Clearness".) is Souma Shirahane's father and was the Makai Knight assigned to Creacity before he went missing three years prior to the events of Garo: Hagane o Tsugu Mono while seeking out the Gate of Destruction. Godou is the creator of the Flash Sword Dance technique, which is a risky but powerful finishing strike that involves drawing darkness into one's sword, purifying it, and unleashing the energy as a wave of light. A Makai Knight performing this technique risks being overwhelmed by darkness, which once befell Souma during a training session. Before his disappearance, Godou taught Ryuga this technique, impressed by the Golden Knight's mastery over his own inner darkness. Godou hints to Ryuga that he could also potentially perform the Dark Flash Sword Dance, which is a similar but opposite technique that instead converts light into darkness, but warns him that it is far more dangerous to use. The title of Zango is said to be near or equal to Garo the Golden Knight in terms of prestige, which fuels Souma's complex towards being a titleless Makai Knight. Godou is eventually found by Souma and Mutsugi frozen in Lost Soul Beast form sealing the Gate of Destruction, having intentionally exceeded his armor's time limit while absorbing an excessive amount of darkness in order to approach the Gate of Destruction and prevent it from opening three years prior. Godou's spirit is last seen acknowledging Souma and Ryuga's victory over the Horror-possessed Mutsugi and the Gate of Destruction.

As Zango, Godou dons an armor that is predominantly white with gold accents and wields a similarly white and gold sword. While armored, his Madōgu partner Ilva, normally a ring, is embedded in the armor's chest. The armor is destroyed and presumed lost when the Gate of Destruction's seal is broken.

Godou Shirahane is portrayed by Masato Hagiwara (萩原 聖人, Hagiwara Masato).

=== Minor Makai Knights ===
- Douji (道寺, Dōji): Rei and Shizuka's adoptive father and the previous Knight who was in charged of keeping order in the western side. He was shown to be bed-ridden by the time he was killed by Barago. Portrayed by Toru Shinagawa (品川 徹, Shinagawa Tōru).
- Koori (桑折): A Makai Knight who defeats a Tekki with Rei. However, he is killed by the revived Tekki before being able to tell Rei his name. Portrayed by Hiroshi Maeda (前田 浩, Maeda Hiroshi).
- Gōki Fudō (布道 ゴウキ, Fudō Gōki): Sigma and Leo's father, and the former Lord, the Flash Knight. Seen only in flashbacks, Gōki trained his twin sons for having one of them inheriting his title. However, despite Sigma noticeably being the stronger of the twins, Gōki chose Leo as his successor instead, claiming that while strength is important, the heart is what makes a warrior. Gōki sees this to be essential for a Makai Knight must be a protector, a trait which Sigma lacks. Portrayed by Daisuke Ban (伴 大介, Ban Daisuke).
- Nobuyoshi Tagajō (多賀城 信義, Tagajō Nobuyoshi): A Makai Knight who has a wife and two sons. During the final battle with Gyanon, he joins an army of Makai Knights. Portrayed by Yōji Tanaka (田中 要次, Tanaka Yōji).
- Kuroudo (クロウド, Kurōdo): The father of Yuna who was murdered by the Horror Ring. Given his ability to corner Ring, it seems that he is rather skilled as a Makai Knight. He trained Yuna to fight from a young age, something Iyu was not so happy about. When Iyu presumably perished, he took care of Yuna on her own and presumably without giving her further training on Makai magic. On the night where he and Kain are supposedly off to fight Ring for the last time, Iyu showed up unexpectedly beside Ring. Shaken and confused, he prevented Kain from landing a hit on Ring which can potentially get Iyu in the crossfire, a chance Ring used to deal a fatal blow to him, before throwing another that severed his arm holding his sword. He died in despair without finding out what happened to his wife. A bone from his severed arm, an amulet he wore on his hand, and his sword were all that were left of him from that fight. Portrayed by Shogen (尚玄, Shōgen).
- Gento (ゲント), Shizuru (シズル), and Nayuta (ナユタ): Shadowfolk Makai Knights attacked by Barg. Gento survived, but Shizuru and Nayuta were killed. Portrayed by Ryuki Kitaoka (北岡 龍貴, Kitaoka Ryūki), Daisuke Nagakura (永倉 大輔, Nagakura Daisuke), and Yoshiki Fujiwara (藤原 儀輝, Fujiwara Yoshiki) respectively.
- Seiji Hiba (檜葉 セイジ, Hiba Seiji): A senior disciple and old friend of Daigo's who ran a Makai Knight dojo before his students were devoured by the Horror Woska. Having chopped off Woska's ear, Seiji uses it to track down the Horror to Daigo's dojo, meeting his friend under false pretenses before Woska reveals himself. Despite refusing help and being gravely injured during the fight, Seiji manages to get his revenge with Ryuga and Daigo's support before Woska's remains are consumed by Jinga and Amily. When Jinga and Amily proceed to mock him by calling late students animal feed, Seiji ends up being promptly killed by the cannibal Horrors in an attempt to kill them for disrespecting his students. His sword and the colorful feather charms he and his students wore are then enshrined in a place of honor in Daigo's dojo. Portrayed by Hiroyuki Takashima (高嶋 宏行, Takashima Hiroyuki).
- Shijo (紫仗, Shijō): A Makai Knight who serves under Rozan. While he is shown to be an accomplished knight capable of wielding a Soul Metal blade, it is implied that he has yet to acquire his own title and armor. He is dressed in notably different manner compared to other Knights, with his coat being a yellow one with brown accents, worn buttoned up, and shown to be wearing little to no black—the traditional dress color associated with the Makai community. He is taken along by Rozan to investigate the peculiar case of a Makai Knight capable of exorcising Horrors. Initially skeptical and insistent in his belief that such a feat cannot be possible, he changes his mind and quickly becomes excited and curious about Jinga's powers after seeing Jinga in action. He is left to be at Jinga's side by Rozan, presumably to keep an eye on the peculiar Knight. He is soon asked by Jinga to tag along in his investigation of the reason behind the abnormal number of Horrors appearing in just one single night. While thanking Jinga wholeheartedly for being given such an unusual opportunity when both are alone out in the night, he is surprisingly and inexplicably killed by Jinga while briefly possessed by his past life. Portrayed by Masanori Sugawara (菅原 昌規, Sugawara Masanori).
- Kaname (要): A Makai Knight with the title of a Guide who is also in charge of training young Makai Knights-to-be including his son Subaru (昴流). While dueling Jinga in a friendly match, he is caught by surprise when the now dark Jinga brandished his Makai sword all the sudden and slit his throat, watching his son killed in front of his eyes before succumbing to his fatal injuries. Portrayed by Satoshi Nikaido (二階堂 智, Nikaidō Satoshi).

=== Other Makai Knights ===
- Akira Godou (五道 アキラ, Godō Akira): A Makai Knight who holds the title of Yaiba the Scorching Heat Knight (灼熱騎士・夜射刃（ヤイバ）, Shakunetsu Kishi Yaiba). (Note: The kanji that make up the name "Yaiba" (夜射刃) are literally translated as "Night Shooting Blade".) The Yaiba armor is unique, as it partially violates the rule that women can not be Makai Knights by causing the bearer to assume a female form while wearing it. The armor is red in color and is armed with a scythe called Gurenzan (紅蓮斬; Crimson Slash), but not much is known about its abilities. Akira is a former student of Barago. This character is exclusive to the novel Garo: Youseki no Wana and the Makai Kessen Gaoh pachinko game.
- Kooki (彪旺牙（コオキ）, Kōki): A junior disciple of Daigo's who holds the title of Zanko the Blue Sky Knight (蒼天騎士・斬虎（ザンコ）, Sōten Kishi Zanko). (Note: The kanji that make up the name "Zanko" (斬虎) are literally translated as "Slashing Tiger".) The Zanko armor is almost identical to Giga's aside from having golden eyes, different shoulder armor, and a single horn on the forehead. As Zanko, Kooki wields two battle axes similar to Giga's Jushinfu. This character is exclusive to the stage Garo: Kami no Kiba Mezame. Portrayed by Yuki Kimisawa (君沢 ユウキ, Kimisawa Yūki).

== Madōgu ==
Although the term "Madōgu" (魔導具) generally refers to all Madō tools, in some context, the term is specifically used to refer to sentient accessory items that serve Makai Knights by providing advice and a vast array of magical powers.

In the franchise's second continuity which centers about Ryuga Dougai instead of Saejima family, Madōgu are more or less treated as relics from a bygone era by the events of Garo: Yami o Terasu Mono and became very rare with most Makai Knights no longer carry them. This is likely motivated by the fact that unlike in Saejima's continuity, such ancient tools require a contract with its user in exchange for shortening their life. This includes said continuity's Zaruba, which consumes one day of Garo's life for each month their contract lasts as a price of providing his services, shortening the Golden Knight's lifespan.

=== Zaruba ===
Madō Ring Zaruba (魔導輪ザルバ, Madōrin Zaruba), named after the old Makai word for "friend", is a Madō Ring who has existed at least as long as Garo itself and traditionally serves as the partner of the Golden Knight. Zaruba is the only character that appeared in all entries of the Garo series with exception of Versus Road. As a Madōgu, the criteria in forming a pact between him and the Golden Knight vary. Typically, Zaruba takes one day of life from his partner during every new moon. Upon their first meeting, he also shows a potential partner intense visions of the horrors they would face as a Makai Knight to test their resolve. His primary role, as with all Madōgu, is as an advisor and Horror detector, supporting a Makai Knight on missions. Zaruba is often very talkative and snarky, frequently bickering with his partner and making sarcastic remarks. However, he is also sincere and faithful, sometimes even serious, when it comes to getting the job done.

In the original series, Zaruba is stated to be created by the veteran Makai Priest Amon, and originally owned by Taiga Saejima before coming into the possession of Kouga. During Kouga's final fight against Kiba, who magically sealed the Makai Knight's ability to summon his armor, Zaruba apparently used all of his energy to call upon the spirits of past Golden Knights to manually deliver the Garo armor to Kouga. This results in Zaruba's physical form crumbling, though he is later restored by the Western Watchdog, albeit with no memories prior to that point. The new ring features dark red eyes rather than the original black.

During the events of Garo: Yami o Terasu Mono of the Ryuga Dougai-centered continuity, Zaruba ends up in Burai's care before being given to the current Garo, Ryuga Dougai. Initially, Zaruba refuses to speak to Ryuga, considering him too immature and reckless. However, witnessing the young Makai Knight's resolve while blinded convinces him that Ryuga is worthy of being the Golden Knight and worth officially forging a partnership. During Garo: Goldstorm Sho, Zaruba has a visor that Ryume attaches to him, enabling him to summon a portal out of any wall, allowing Ryuga and Rian to access Ryume's Watchdog Center from virtually anywhere. Zaruba is apparently unable to speak while the visor is closed and will make a ringing noise to signal that he has something to say, a trait which Ryuga uses to shut Zaruba up if he deems the Madō Ring to be too noisy. In this continuity, Zaruba is more no-nonsense and speaks more infrequently. During the events of Garo: Hagane o Tsugu Mono, Zaruba no longer has the visor attachment.

The full extent of Zaruba's abilities and knowledge is unknown. The original series shows he has the ability to dispel confusion, detect various spiritual energies, summon the Garouken, speak on behalf of the dead, enable temporary flight to his wearer, breathe Madō Fire, detect Horrors, create parts of himself into a ring to acts as a transceiver, see through illusions, converse with Kouga telepathically, act as a temporary storage for miniature items, and gauge the power of items. He helped train Kouga when Kouga was still a child after Taiga's death. He has since advised him on a variety of matters and even taught Kouga how to play poker. He can be temporarily lent to others without forging an official pact. Kaoru once used Zaruba to guide her through the Crimson Forest back to the human world. His illusive power can also be used to create a simulation for his owner to train in basic combat. In the Ryuga Dougai-centered continuity, he is not shown to have any particular special abilities, serving merely as an advisor and Horror detector. However, he is shown to have the power to summon a purifying wolf statue, enabling Ryuga to cleanse his sword of built-up malevolence without needing to return to a Watchdog.

Zaruba is voiced by Hironobu Kageyama (影山 ヒロノブ, Kageyama Hironobu).

=== Silva ===
Madō Necklace Silva (魔導具シルヴァ, Madōgu Shiruva) is the amulet-type Madōgu of Rei Suzumura, also known as Zero, the Silver Fanged Knight. Unlike most other Madōgu, she has a human like-face. She is composed in personality and behaves in a ladylike manner. Originally belonging to Douji, Sliva reveals her previous master's murderer to be another Makai Knight. Though her full abilities are unclear, she serves as Rei's advisor and, until he starts frequenting Bakura's bar Lupo, his only true companion. In Zero: Dragon Blood she also acts as a communicator between Bakura and Rei. During Rei's battle with Gulm, Silva took a hit meant for Rei and was damaged as a result. By the events of Garo Special: Byakuya no Maju, Silva is repaired and converted into a pin that is attached to Rei's left glove, though she can still be attached to a chain and given to others as a necklace. Unlike most Madōgu, who refer to their owners by name, Silva only refers to Rei as "Zero." The name "Silva" means "family" in the old Makai language.

Unlike Zaruba who is quite indifferent who he ends up with and often bickers with the one he serves, Silva is quite attached to Rei, often having friendly, teasing conversations with her partner on matters unrelated to Makai business.

Silva is voiced by Ai Orikasa (折笠 愛, Orikasa Ai).

=== Goruba ===
Madō Bracelet Goruba (魔導具ゴルバ, Madōgu Goruba) is the bracelet-type Madōgu of Tsubasa Yamagatana, also known as Dan, the Midnight Sun Knight. He is an old man in terms of personality as he is one of the oldest Madōgu in existence. Like other Madōgu, Goruba functions as a Horror detector. During the Legules tribe's attack, Goruba was briefly possessed by Legules, revealing the Horror's goals after leaving him to kidnap Rin and take the Phosphorus Spear. The name "Goruba" means "rule" in the old Makai language.

Goruba is voiced by Kenichi Ogata (緒方 賢一, Ogata Ken'ichi).

=== Uruba ===
Madō Mirror Uruba (魔導具ウルバ, Madōgu Uruba) is the circular hand mirror-type Madōgu of Wataru Shijima, also known as Baron, the Thunder Knight. Childlike in personality, Uruba's face appears on the mirror's reflective surface.

Uruba is voiced by Ai Orikasa.

=== Eruba ===
Madō Ring Eruba (魔導輪エルバ, Madōrin Eruba) is the Madō Ring of Leo Fudō, also known as Lord, the Flash Knight. She is an old woman in personality. It is stated that Madō Rings like Eruba are rare, typically reserved only for Knight lineages of high prestige, such as the Saejima and Fudō clans.

Eruba is voiced by Ai Orikasa.

=== Orva ===
Madō Brooch Orva (魔導具オルヴァ, Madōgu Oruva) is the brooch-type Madōgu of Crow, the Phantom Knight, embedded in his gorget. She has a personality much like a teenage girl.

Orva is voiced by Eri Ōzeki (大関 英里, Ōzeki Eri).

=== Alva ===
Madō Ring Alva (魔導輪アルヴァ, Madōrin Aruva) is the Madō Ring of Jinga Mikage, also known as Roze, the Glittering Shadow Knight. She shares a professional, casual relationship with Jinga, rarely speaking until there is Horror-related business to be addressed. She is also used to interpret the dancing ring light from a lamp at Jinga's hideout, which is used for receiving orders from their Watchdog. Unlike most other sapient Madōgu who like humanity to a certain degree, Alva is cynical and distrustful of humans in general, quipping once that she doesn't believe in friendship at all, finding eventual betrayal an inevitability. As Jinga does not remove Alva when being possessed by his dark self, Alva presumably has full knowledge of the atrocities he wrought. The reason why she keeps quiet about it is currently unknown. Alva is eventually abandoned by Jinga when he believes that she, like his other allies, has turned against him.

Alva is voiced by Miyavi Matsunoi (松野井 雅, Matsunoi Miyabi), who portrayed Amily, Jinga's Makai Priestess wife in previous works.

=== Ilva ===
Madō Ring Ilva (魔導輪イルヴァ, Madōrin Iruva) is the Madō Ring of Godou Shirahane, also known as Zango, the Light Slash Knight. When Godou dons the Zango armor, she is instead embedded in the armor's chest. She speaks politely. After Godou's death, she comes into Souma's possession.

Ilva is voiced by Yuka Suzumura (鈴村 ゆか, Suzumura Yuka).

== Makai Priests ==
Prior to the emergence of Makai Knights, the Makai Priests (魔戒法師, Makai Hōshi) and Priestesses were the first and the only group to battle the Horrors. After the establishment of Makai Knights, Makai Priests began taking a supporting role, serving as combat backup for Makai Knights in the field or creating and maintaining Madō Tools and important records.

=== Priest Amon ===
Priest Amon (阿門法師, Amon-hōshi) is a Makai Priest who was known to be one of the greatest Makai Priest to have ever lived. He helped Taiga in creating anti-Horror weapons, spells and devices. He was the one who created Zaruba, stating that his greatest regret in Zaruba's creation is giving him a loud mouth. He's similar to Chinese Taoist Priest-exorcists who learned Makai techniques along with martial arts to slay Horrors. He loves drinking red sake and playing Barchess, wagering 10 years of life to the winner of the game. Amon never completed his game with Taiga and waited 20 years for Kouga to replace his father. As Kouga nearly lost, Amon told him to return again to play another time. It wasn't long that he was murdered under mysterious circumstances and the Watchdogs pointed their fingers at his proud student, Jabi. He died holding a chess piece Koma, cluing that his killer was a Makai Knight, likely Barago. He contacted Rin to help him deliver a message to Kouga relating to Jabi.

Priest Amon is portrayed by Akaji Maro (麿 赤児, Maro Akaji).

=== Jabi ===
Jabi (邪美) is a childhood friend of Kouga who was taught in the Makai ways under Makai Priest Amon. She and Kouga trained together, but went their separate ways during their teenage years. Jabi is a sensually aggressive woman and wants to be a good woman rather than being a talented Makai Priestess. She carries two Madō Brushes (魔導筆, Madōhitsu) to summon electrical attacks and has two red Makai flags used to ward off certain magical attacks. By the she and Kouga cross paths again, Jabi has been framed with the murder of her mentor and has stolen the purified Horror blades due to be subject to Force Repatriation. Though Kouga believes she is not responsible for the murder, Jabi is unable to trust him initially because Amon's murderer is a Makai Knight. She is shown to have feelings for Kouga, yet knowing full well that she cannot have him as his heart now belongs to Kaoru. Jabi reveals the Eastern Watchdogs' true nature before agreeing to Kouga enter the Crimson Forest once they deal with the Horror Blades. When she and Kouga attempt to perform the Force Repatriation on their own, Jabi is seemingly killed by a surprise attack from Kodama, and is vaporized with only her Madō Brush remaining.

In Garo Special: Byakuya no Maju, it is revealed Jabi's body has not destroyed as presumed, but was recovered and is incubating inside the Makai Tree, still alive yet stuck between life and death. Amon discovers the complication and dispatches Rin to help him inform Kouga that only a person with a strong bond with her can awaken her and bring her back to the living. With the help of Rin, he is able to enter the Makai Forest and fights his way to free Jabi. Jabi has since taken a liking to Rin and assists Rin in her Makai training, eventually being acknowledged by Tsubasa a real person when she performs a painful Makai version of blood transfusion to dilute Legules's poison within Rin as there is not enough time to obtain a Varrancas Fruit. After Legules is slain, Jabi decides to stay at Kantai as she has found someone she feels strongly to protect in Rin.

During the events of Garo: Makai Senki, Jabi arrives to Kouga's aid to repair Zaruba. In the process, she confronts masked Sigma Fudō as he attempts to steal Zaruba from her for use in a ritual. After stealing him back and driving Sigma back, Jabi has Zaruba promise not to tell Kouga of what has transpired as she later tells the Makai Knight to be wary of Makai Priests around him.

In Garo: Makai Retsuden, it is shown that Jabi has entered a romantic relationship with Tsubasa Yamagatana, also known as Dan the Midnight Sun Knight, and the two hunt Horrors together.

Jabi is portrayed by Yasue Sato (佐藤 康恵, Satō Yasue). As a child, she is portrayed by Mizuho Kaneo (兼尾 瑞穂, Kaneo Mizuho).

=== Rin Yamagatana ===
Rin Yamagatana (山刀 鈴, Yamagatana Rin) is a young Makai Priestess from Kantai who is the younger sister of her land's resident Makai Knight Tsubasa. Though she was fearful of the dangers of Kantai, Rin became a Makai Priestess so she can make her brother smile again. Introduced during the events of Garo Special: Byakuya no Maju, eleven years old at the time, Rin somehow managed to communicate with Amon and was given the mission to find Kouga by using Horror blood to bait herself in hopes to find Kouga in his district. Once finding Kouga and relaying Amon's message, with Garai believing she was meant to aid him as she was named after his mother, Rin brings the Makai Knight to Kantai and manages to muster courage to endure keeping the way to the Makai Forest long enough for Kouga to save Jabi. However, Rin was poisoned by a piece of shrapnel from Legules the following night attack and was barely saved when Jabi performs a risky move in which she dilutes her blood with Rin using Madō Fire as a medium. Though Rin is saved by the poison, she is kidnapped by Legules to serve as a sacrificial offering. After being saved by Kouga, Rin gains Jabi as both a protector and a teacher. By the events of the film Garo Gaiden: Tougen no Fue, Rin is now in her teen years. After having spent several years under Jabi's tutelage, she has become a skilled Makai Priestess in her own right and is now capable of conducting lessons.

Rin Yamagatana is portrayed by Yuzumi Shibamoto (柴本 優澄美, Shibamoto Yuzumi).

=== Priestess Garai ===
Priestess Garai (我雷法師, Garai-hōshi) is the Makai Priestess of Kantai and the very master that trained Rin Saejima. She's more of a teacher than a Makai Priest in her advance age. However her knowledge, experience and wisdom are great and her students reflect that level of respect for her.

Priestess Garai is portrayed by Kazue Tsunogae (角替 和枝, Tsunogae Kazue).

=== Rin Saejima ===
Rin Saejima (冴島 りん, Saejima Rin) is the wife of Taiga and mother to Kouga. She was trained as a Makai Priestess under Priestess Garai. She would eventually meet and marry Taiga and give birth to Kouga. Her life with Kouga was short when she died of illness. Kouga barely remembers her, but is reminded by Taiga of their time together as a family. In a flashback it is revealed her martial arts skills are on par with Taiga and always had baby Kouga close to her.

Rin Saejima is portrayed by Junko Tashiro (田代 純子, Tashiro Junko).

=== Rekka ===
Rekka (烈花) is a Makai Priestess and one of the disciples of Akaza whose father Kengi was murdered by the Horror Karma, allying herself to Garo during the events of Garo: Red Requiem. She is a tomboy in personality, resenting her nature as a female as it kept her from her childhood dream of becoming a Makai Knight and forced her to be trained as a Makai Priestess instead, briefly meeting Kouga during his training under Wataru. She wears a duster over her tunic, which is the common dressing style of Makai Knights instead of dressing like most other Makai Priests, and uses the brasher pronoun "ore" over more feminine ones like "atashi", presumably as reminders of her original wish. Rather than becoming one who support Makai Knights as usually expected of other Makai Priests, she actively goes out to hunt Horrors on her own, resulting in her above-average martial capabilities and extensive use of combat magic. Among her abilities is the summoning of the Young Demon World Dragons to seal Horrors.

Rekka is stoic and strong like Kouga, yet can be hot-headed and dedicated herself to hunting Horrors to the point where she would harm innocents in the process. She even resents having Kouga around at first as he might rob her of her chance of avenging her father. But during her time with Kouga, he gave Rekka the same lessons her father taught him and becomes a better person, especially when Kouga suffers serious injuries due to her over-eager approach of getting her hands on Karma. She played a key role in helping Kouga take down Karma by summoning the spirits of the fallen within the mirror realm, allowing Kouga to assume a more powerful form and turn the tables on Karma. Taking over the late Akaza's territory after defeating Karma, Rekka gives Kouga one of Demon World Dragons if he should need to contact her and vice versa. She reappears in Garo: Makai Senki when she and Kouga cross paths hunting Sedinbale, learning more about him as a person as well as his weakening condition. After the re-sealing of Sedinbale, now understanding the Makai Knights' resolve and having new-found respect for Kaoru, Rekka returns to her territory. She confronted Shiguto, who is enthralled by Sigma's ideals and wish for Rekka to come along, reminding him of the promise they made to Kouga and asserting that no good will come to humanity, should the Knights and Priests get busy fighting each other. In Zero: Dragon Blood, she has been promoted to a Makai Priestess serving the Senate.

Rekka is portrayed by Mary Matsuyama (松山 メアリ, Matsuyama Meari). As a child, she is portrayed by Miku Yokoyama (横山 未空, Yokoyama Miku).

=== Shiguto ===
Shiguto (シグト) is one of the disciples of Akaza. After Akaza's death, he owns Akaza's Madō Brush.

Shiguto is portrayed by Masahiro Kuranuki (倉貫 匡弘, Kuranuki Masahiro). As a child, he is portrayed by Ryohei Sato (佐藤 涼平, Satō Ryōhei).

=== Akaza ===
Akaza (アカザ) is a Makai Priest who usually runs the antique shop Akadou (あかどう, Akadō). He supplies Kouga with the tools to fight Karma. However, it is revealed he fell for one of Karma's illusions. To atone for his sins, he sacrifices himself to allow Rekka to summon the souls of the Makai Knights and empower Garo's armor.

Akaza is portrayed by Yōsuke Saitō (斉藤 洋介, Saitō Yōsuke).

=== Leo Fudō ===
Leo Fudō (布道 レオ, Fudō Leo) is a young Makai Priest serving the Senate whose youth belittles the extent of his genius. However, Leo is also a Makai Knight holding the title, Lord, the Flash Knight (閃光騎士・狼怒（ロード）, Senkō Kishi Rōdo) (Note: The kanji that make up the name "Lord" (狼怒, Rōdo) are literally translated as "Wolf Anger".) and hides this fact from the Senate. As Lord, Leo dons a suit of light purple armor, with a horned wolf helmet. A genius inventor, Leo is the one who invented the mechanical creatures known as Gōryū (号竜) that his fellow Makai Priests begin using to fight Horrors, though he does not show the same liking or passion with conventional machines. He is surprisingly humble and friendly for a young genius, without even the slightest hint of cockiness or sense of superiority, though he is shown to have a sharp tongue. Like his brother, he has no qualms about using questionable methods when it comes to banishing the Horror menace, though nowhere near as extreme as the methods of Sigma. This is evident when he persuades Mio that it is alright for Sigma to use Gyanon in his creation of Idea, and he himself later creates masterpiece Gōryū Colt (コルト, Koruto) by literally reprogramming a Horror to be Colt's artificial intelligence, and shows irritation when Kouga warns him about using such dangerous methods.

Both he and Sigma were trained to be Makai Knights from a very young age, and both were extremely gifted as both learned advanced magic without any formal training. Sigma was revealed to be the comparatively and significantly more gifted sibling and was the one responsible for both initiating Leo's training in magic as well as influencing him in deciding to become a Makai Priest, so as to aid Sigma when Sigma got old enough to inherit the title of Lord and the armor. Leo studied magic alongside his Makai Knight training with that intention in mind. Surprisingly, when they had both came of age, their father decided to pass the title and armor to Leo instead, enraging Sigma and prompting him to run away from home. He appealed on Sigma's behalf but his father persisted in his decision nonetheless. Sigma returned three years later when their father died. While Leo was happy to see him and wanted to pass the title and armor back to him, Sigma declared that he too shall be a Makai Priest, having found a way to permanently rid the world of Horrors, and declaring that soon, all Makai Knights shall be rendered redundant. The way to it would his ultimate Magōryū (魔号竜), Idea (イデア).

He was also a good friend of Mio, a mute Makai Priestess who was also Sigma's friend. She went on a trip to look for Sigma who ran away from home, and later when Sigma came home, went together with Sigma to look for ways in completing Idea, the ultimate Magōryū conceived by Sigma. She was devastated when she found out later that one of the criteria of completing Idea was providing large numbers of human sacrifices used as fuel to activate Gyanon's powers, but eventually she decided to stop Sigma herself prior to sending Leo a letter detailing what would be a suicide mission while revealing his brother's madness. Upon reading, Leo arrives at Sigma's lair too late to save Mio from his brother's wrath.

At the start of the series when Kouga is made a Makai Knight of the Senate, Leo is assigned to be his partner. During one of their earlier missions together, the aforementioned Colt goes rogue, Leo attempts to sacrifice himself to stop Colt from becoming a menace before Kouga stops him and subdues the Gōryū. He is also a caring friend to Kouga, constantly worried about the seal on Kouga's chest. While taking Kaoru with him to see the Spirit Beast in hopes that it would restore the Madō Brush that belonged to someone dear to him, revealed later to be Mio. Leo is forced to reveal his Makai Knight swordsmanship in front of Kaoru to stave off the Spirit Beast's guardian beast, and asks her later to tell no one, especially Kouga, of his ability to wield a sword along with their encounter with the sacred animal. Leo later tells Kaoru that he will be leaving for a while, with his connection to the red-masked man revealed over time as his twin brother, Sigma Fudō. Eventually, Leo is forced to become Lord in order to save a weakened Kouga from Sigma. He tries to reason with Sigma, only for his twin to denounce him as his brother.

When he and Sigma are on board the Madō Train (魔導列車, Madō Ressha), he attempts to reason with his brother again, as well as giving the Flash Knight armor to Sigma, claiming that it belongs to Sigma. Sigma however, is unmoved, and demonstrated his ability to summon the Jaaku armor and brands Leo with the Seal of Destruction. Seeing that now there is no hope in reasoning or saving his brother, Leo no longer refers Sigma as his brother and vows to cut him down himself. Unfortunately, Leo's martial capabilities prove to be nowhere near that of Sigma's and he is easily defeated. Leo has only manage to survive due to Kouga's nick-of-time intervention. Leo is later present during the Saejima manor's destruction, eager to join in the fight but told by Kouga to stand back, for it is his mission to put an end to his former friend. Sigma later passes his brush to Leo before passing.

In Garo: Makai Retsuden, it is revealed that he continues to serve under the Senate, and no longer has a partner as he is both Knight and Priest. He no longer hides the fact that he is also a Makai Knight, and has come to rely on his abilities as a Knight as well as his armor more, despite still referring to himself predominantly as a Makai Priest. He sends Yuna and Kain to investigate the whereabouts of a Tekki (鉄機) without letting them know that he is behind the order so as to test their abilities and resolve. Despite ending up having to save Yuna personally, he commends Yuna's resolve to fight despite her lack of necessary skills, and refers to her as a Makai Knight due to her preference for the sword, despite the fact that she is a woman and will never be able to summon an armor of her own. While she initially doubts her status, she tells her that what matters as a Knight is her pride as a Knight, not the armor—a quote from Kouga that he has taken to heart.

As Lord, Leo dons ornate periwinkle and gold armor and wields a massive scimitar-like blade.

Leo Fudō is portrayed by Ozuno Nakamura (中村 織央, Nakamura Ozuno). As a child, he is portrayed by Ken Uekusa (植草 賢, Uekusa Ken).

=== Burai ===
Burai (符礼) is a Makai Priest in Vol City who trained Ryuga on an isolated island with his werewolf-like Makai Beast Ragō (羅号) as Ryuga's training partner, being the childhood friend of the youth's mother Hakana. He does not talk much and rarely shows emotions, usually opening his mouth when he issues orders or when the matters at hand need to be addressed. He nevertheless exudes an air suggesting that he knows far more than he lets on. Originally, as a child, Burai came to the Tower of Heroic Spirits alongside Hakana mocked the blackened Garo armor alongside his childhood friend Ouma before told how the armor lost its radiance and decided to help Hakana in its restoration. As a result, Burai learned of Zedom and the Madō Horrors. Later believing Hakana died alongside their friends in Hill of Zedom's Arm, Burai was wracked with guilt to the point of attempting suicide. He was stopped by Ouma, and seeing Ryuga and Rian continuing despite losing their families, Burai adopts the latter and trains her before seeing her to Kantai to complete her training. It was only once she graduated that Burai stationed himself at Vol City, which lacked a protector at the time. As the unofficial leader of the Makai Knights stationed at Vol City, Bura normally works behind his desk and issues out. When needed to, Burai can personally oversee matters with by summoning Ragō that can devour Horrors. Though he kept his side of the story behind the Madō Horrors as well as their origins initially from the group, he aids them by developing the Madō Horror Detector (魔導ホラー探知器, Madō Horā Tanchiki) to make their hunt for them more easy.

During Tousei's massacre of the Kaneshiro family, Burai is knocked out by Sonshi and remains unconscious for most of the time the rest of the group going to confront Tousei, waking up only to find that they are making a dire mistake and that he is too late to stop them. Nevertheless, Burai manages to catch up with the group and creates a distraction enough to have Aguri and Takeru flee the scene while spiriting away a young Makai Priestess he recognized as Hakana while leaving Zaruba with Ryuga. As the resurrected Zedom begins to break free from his prison, Burai resolves to stop the Horror in what he expected would be an act of sacrificing himself by becoming a sealing vessel to ease Zedom's wrath. Being confronted by Ryuga who knows his plan right from the start, he reveals that that had always been his plan since the day he failed to protect Hakana, telling Ryuga that he loved both Rian and Ryuga as if they were his own and they were the ones who kept him going. Though he failed in his intended sacrifice, with his Madō Brush remaining after the Horror obliterated him, Burai succeeded in creating a weak spot within Zedom that the Makai Knights capitalize on.

Burai is portrayed by Kohei Otomo (大友 康平, Ōtomo Kōhei).

=== Rian ===
Rian (莉杏) is a flashy Makai Priestess who has trust issues due to her upbringing. She is Burai's only disciple, entrusted to Burai's care before her father died. Initially planned to be sent to Kantai soon after adoption, her actions and singing unwittingly inspired Burai, who attempted suicide, to live and honor his words to the friends he lost. She was trained personally by Burai for several years before being sent to Kantai for further training, graduating as one of the top students and attributing her success to Burai's early teachings. She left for Vol City with Burai as soon as she went home after graduation. Unlike other Makai Priests, Rian used a Makai Gun (魔戒銃, Makaijū) more so than the traditional Madō Brush. She is also skilled in changing her appearance, often going around places looking like an ordinary girl of her age and doing undercover work to dig out Horrors, sporting her Makai Priestess look only when she needs to fight.

At first, dating only the rich and those whom she perceives to be strong so not to suffer the same pain of losing a loved one like as a child, Rian took an interest in Ryuga despite not thinking much of him initially. But over time, getting to know Ryuga better over time with a better idea of how strong he actually is, Rian eventually developed feelings for the Makai Knight, going so far as to even suggesting that they "make a baby" together. Her initial interest and later infatuation with Ryuga develops into a lasting friendship.

Rian also becomes fast friends with Enhou due to their ideas of self-empowerment. She is devastated when she confirms that Enhou is no longer human, and despite Ryuga having an upper hand in the fight against Enhou, she begs Ryuga not to cut Enhou down, which coincidentally is something Ryuga is reluctant to do himself. She later ends up as Tousei's captive to serve in the germination of a new supply of Madō Horror Plants, attempting to rekindle Enhou's humanity while taken to Hill of Zedom's Head. Luckily, Ryuga saves Rian as she helps him slay Enhou when Tousei sends her after them. Not wanting Enhou to be remembered as a monster, Rian assumes her identity to expose the conspiracy set against her and her friends while having the SG1 members believe that Enhou died a human. Keeping her friend's necklace as a keepsake, Rian vowed to carry out what she believed to be Enhou's dream of a Vol City without Horrors. Once Vol City is saved, Rian erases all memories regarding the Makai from the residents, intending to remain in the city to protect the Makai Priest ruins. But Aguri taking over her duty allows Rian to travel with Ryuga to support him as Burai and Hakana have.

She continues to travel with Ryuga before the events of Garo: Goldstorm Sho, now sporting a new appearance and considerably less reliant on disguises. She also sports a new Makai Gun, which ironically, is only used sparingly. While on the quest of sealing Radan, Rian befriended a young teacher named Mina whose upcoming marriage makes her consider her relationship to Ryuga. Though Rian created a barrier to keep her safe, the actions of Amily resulted in Mina's death, which Rian continues to blame herself for.

During the events of Garo: Higashi no Kairou, Rian is chosen by Ryume as her successor as Kairou. When she learns the history of the Dragon Tribe and the truth that her late mother was a tribal Makai Priestess, she decides to become the new Kairou.

Rian is portrayed by Miki Nanri (南里 美希, Nanri Miki). As a child, she is portrayed by Emiri Kai (甲斐 恵美利, Kai Emiri).

=== Hakana ===
Hakana (波奏) is Ryuga's mother and a childhood friend of Burai and Ouma. She possess the uncanny trait of hearing thoughts embedded within objects, which is later inherited by her son, Ryuga. She is the Makai Priestess who took it upon herself to restore Garo's radiance since she first heard of the armor's plea to restore its radiance, during a trip to the Tower of Heroic Spirits as a child. Ten years ago, in a risky chance to restore the Garo armor's radiance, Hakana became one of the priestesses to sing Zedom's Requiem to germinate a Madō Horror Plant at the Hill of Zedom's Arm. However, the unexpected interference of Tousei Kaneshiro resulted in Hakana being knocked out by Zedom's freed arm and seeded with far more Madō Horror Seeds than initially intended, before being carried to the Hill of Zedom's Head. Hakana is then forced to germinate Madō Horror Plants with the seeds in her, losing her memories bit by bit with each germination and regressing in age. By the time the final Madō Horror Plant was removed from her body, while still singing to keep Zedom from awakening, Hakana has regressed to a childlike form. Despite this, Hakana indirectly aided Ryuga with her singing and played a role in his armor's restoration. Whenever Ryuga defeats a Madō Horror, he is shown some of Hakana's memories. Eventually, with Rian ending up her replacement, Hakana is taken to safety by Burai and is restored to her proper age. Though she reunites with her son, sacrificing her eyesight to restore Ryuga's, Hakana reveals that being made to germinate multiple Madō Horror Plants has caused her to slowly transform into a Horror with Zedom's resurrection speeding up the process. She eventually has Ryuga cut her down after witnessing the Garo armor regaining its golden radiance.

Hakana is portrayed by Megumi Yokoyama (横山 めぐみ, Yokoyama Megumi). As former appearances, she is portrayed by Ayana Shiramoto (白本 彩奈, Shiramoto Ayana), Hinako Go (郷 日向子, Gō Hinako), and Mikako Monma (門間 三可子, Monma Mikako).

=== Yuna ===
Yuna (ユナ) is a Makai Priestess whose father Kuroudo was murdered by the Horror Ring. It was not known how she was like before Kuroudo was killed, but currently she sports brooding and impulsive personality, a result of being consumed by thoughts of vengeance towards Ring yet painfully aware that she does not have what it takes to cut down her father's murderer. Like many priests and priestesses, she was not trained in the use of Soul Metal weapons. In desperation of wanting revenge against her father's murderer with her own hands, she had Kain magically implanted a segment of a bone from his father's severed arm into her arm, which allows her to use her father's Makai Sword but puts a tremendous strain on her body, causing her intense pain whenever she overexerts herself. In Zero: Black Blood, she seeks Rei's help together with Kain, after coming to conclusion that both of them alone are inadequate to defeat the powerful Horror.

Despite being moderately skilled in battle, her impulsiveness and thirst for revenge always gets the better of her. That, coupled with her inexperience in wielding a Soul Metal weapon, results in brash and clumsy attacks that are easily predictable. In order to keep her from hurting herself further, Rei challenges her to a fight and easily beats her senseless, driving home the message that her current mindset and skills do her no good in their quest of hunting down Ring. While she is known to be a Makai Priestess, she has yet to display any skills with magic, with the only priestess-like ability being the song she inherited from her mother, Iyu.

In Garo: Makai Retsuden, it is revealed that she is active as a Makai Swordswoman (魔戒剣士, Makai Kenshi), and continues to be Kain's partner. Though improved noticeably since she first took up her father's sword, she still lacked the necessary finesse and constitution required to properly wield a Soul Metal weapon. She has also taken up a brush and started training as a Makai Priestess. However, due to serious lack of formal training in her formative years, she is currently only capable of simple, crude spells which she uses in conjunction with her sword. Her status as neither a full-fledged Knight or Priestess, but some weird and incomplete hybrid of both, causes her tremendous anxiety and sense of inferiority, which she usually hides under a cheerful facade. She is driven into further desperation due to being a woman, and as such is unable to inherit his father's will and become a Makai Knight.

After a mission to slay a Tekki, secretly assigned by Leo Fudō, also known as Lord the Flash Knight, Leo invites her to join him at the Senate. Yuna refuses out of a desire to carve out her own path as a unique warrior within the Makai Order, vowing to train her abilities to their fullest despite her inexperience at her age and inability to ever summon her father's armor.

Yuna is portrayed by Riria Kojima (小島 梨里杏, Kojima Riria). As a child, she is portrayed by Chiari Komori (小森 茅愛, Komori Chiari).

=== Kain ===
Kain (カイン) is a Makai Priest and Yuna's partner who was formerly Kuroudo's partner. Despite appearing goofy and laid-back, it is actually a front with which he hides his pain and sorrow. He was with Kuroudo when they had Ring cornered, but he was unable to prevent his partner from being killed by the powerful Horror. Distraught and wracked with guilt, he conceded to Yuna's wish of having a bone from Kuroudo's severed hand implanted in her hand despite knowing the act to be a bad idea, as while it allows her to use Kuroudo's Makai Sword, it also puts a tremendous strain on her body.

He is somewhat of an alcoholic and can often be seen drinking beer when not fighting. Unlike most priests of his time, he seldom uses his brush and wields a Madō Umbrella (魔導傘, Madōgasa) all the time in battle. The umbrella can be used as both a shield and a shotgun.

After slaying Ring, he continues to hang around with Yuna as her partner, and it is suggested that he has developed feelings for her. He continues to train her to be a Makai Priestess, but finds it very difficult due to both Yuna's insistence to prioritize her sword over her brush, as well as having a totally different style of combat from her. He is stronger than he looks and is noted by Leo to be a capable Priest. Despite being concerned with Yuna's mental state, he chooses to play along with her cheerful facade most of the time, opting to remind her that she does not have to rush and that he is around for her at times.

Kain is portrayed by Naoki Takeshi (武子 直輝, Takeshi Naoki).

=== Shidou ===
Shidou (四道, Shidō) is a Makai Priest serving the Senate who is the leading authority in Makai knowledge and a medical and pharmaceutical specialist. He is also the one in charge of Mayuri.

Shidou is portrayed by Ren Osugi (大杉 漣, Ōsugi Ren).

=== Bikuu ===
Bikuu (媚空, Bikū) is a Makai Priestess who is a Darkness Slasher (闇斬師, Yamigirishi). When her brother Izumo falls into darkness prior to becoming the host of the Horror Latel, Bikuu remains intent to slay him on her own, but is forced to team up with Raiga and Crow as she alone prove to be inadequate in completing this particular mission. Once Izumo is slain, Bikuu begins her search for the person responsible for breaking the seal on the Ady Slate. Once she found Eiji Busujima however, despite noting that he still committed a heinous crime against their order, Bikuu deems him no longer a threat against their order or humanity and helps to treat his wound. She later goes hunting for Zesshin, getting acquainted with Daichi, who later becomes her apprentice, in the process. She learns during this mission that there is more to the human heart and mind than the color of their orbs within, from how Mutsuki's orb turns black while killing her peers trying to steal a spell allegedly to save her son, Daichi, and how the orb of her former master, Byakkai, stays white despite him being the one orchestrating the entire Zesshin incident. She goes against her code of breaking blackened orbs, and executes her former master by breaking his still-white orb, using the Soul Insertion spell.

As noted by Crow, she is one of the Shadowfolk and that her profession of hunting humans instead of Horrors makes her appear untrustworthy, as well as resulting in her emotionless outlook and inability to trust others. However, she is far from being unreasonably cold and paranoid as expected by most of her peers, and is quite a reasonable and gentle person, seen due to despite her job of hunting fallen Makai practitioners, she is willing to give any redeemed ones chances to make amends.

Due to her work as a hunter of potent Makai practitioners, Bikuu is a capable fighter, whose martial prowess is considered one of the best among Makai Priests and even rival those of Makai Knights'. Her magic, as a result, also leans heavily towards tracking and combat. She wields a somewhat thicker and longer brush, which serves as an effective short striking weapon other than a focus to channel magical energies. One notable technique is that she can conjure a bow using her brush as a focus and use it to shoot powerful spiritual arrows. Although it is a powerful move, it is impractical in most cases due to time required for the conjuring, and also because the move is very taxing. Unlike most Makai practitioners, her garb has little leather to maximize ease of movement, and she wears a reinforced conical which also serves as a throwing weapon. When she battles in a person's mind, she becomes White Flame (白炎, Byakuen) wearing white clothing. While fighting Zesshin in Daichi's mind, she becomes Heavenly Life Bikuu (天生媚空, Tensei Bikū) through Daichi's spell.

Bikuu is portrayed by Sayaka Akimoto (秋元 才加, Akimoto Sayaka).

=== Priest Sōtatsu ===
Priest Sōtatsu (双竜法師, Sōtatsu-hōshi) is a Makai Priest and the creator of the Madōgu Agō who desired a world free of Horrors. Ages ago, he fought with Agō against the Horror Degol, but was eventually killed.

Priest Sōtatsu is portrayed by Akira Emoto (柄本 明, Emoto Akira).

=== Ryume ===
Ryume (龍女（リュメ）) is a skilled Makai Priestess who protects Line City (ラインシティ, Rain Shiti), a city totally free of Horrors due to her influence. She is also a member of the Dragon Tribe (龍族, Ryū-zoku), who protect the land of dragons, and is responsible the special role of the Kairou (界楼, Kairō), the one who is connected to the dragon and serves as the guardian of the gate that connects the land of dragons and the human world. She does not physically age due to her incredibly strong magical powers, having the appearance of a young woman despite being centuries old. She is severely injured and weakened in the battle with Agō, forcing her to remain on her throne to heal for quite some time afterward. During her recuperation, she effectively acts as Ryuga and Rian's Watchdog, giving the duo assignments and informing them of major Horror activity. Once she is fully healed, however, she joins the group in battling Jinga and Amily. Despite her small stature, Ryume is more than capable as a combatant, using her two scroll hair accessories as catalysts for her spells, as well as implements to bind her opponents.

Despite being wise, seasoned and hardened due to having centuries of experience dealing with Makai practitioners and threats, she smiles a lot and behaves kindly and playfully until situations force her to be serious. Due to her age, experience and powers, she is usually revered by those around her and addressed to with proper honorifics, although Ryume herself does not care much for status and prefer to treat her juniors as equals.

During the events of Garo: Higashi no Kairou, Ryume passes away as a result of being relieved of her duties as Kairou due to the dragon's once-every-500-years reincarnation.

Ryume is portrayed by Sakina Kuwae (桑江 咲菜, Kuwae Sakina), while her old woman voice is voiced by Yu Mizuno (水野 ゆふ, Mizuno Yū).

=== Gald ===
Gald (ガルド, Garudo) is a Makai Priest who is one of the last surviving members of Homura Village (火群の里, Homura no Sato), though his name is a term for a Makai Priest entrusted to maintain Radan's seal over the generations. In the past, the boy and his sister Haruna lived in a town before it was ravaged by a crazed Jinga slaughtering their family and friends. After a Makai Priest named Moyuru sacrificed himself to ensure their escape while giving them instructions to Homura village, unaware of Jinga's identity at the time, Gald developed a deep-seated hatred for all Makai Knights, the boy was taken under Hikage's wing and became a Makai Priest who would be named the current Gald.

While a laid-back, observant, and in general a competent Makai Priest despite his young age, Gald has a holier-than-thou attitude with a tendency of treating others as tools. In Rian's words, Gald is little more than a brat who is overconfident with his abilities. He is very proud of his heritage and has little tolerance for anyone whom he sees to be insulting him or his now near-extinct people. His heritage is where his sense of duty on sealing Radan stems from, and he is serious about it to the point of refusing aid from others on completing the task.

At first, Gald stays out of the way, keeping an eye on Ryuga after learning that the seal containing Radan has been broken. But once Ryuga leads him to Jinga, Gald makes his presence known as he interrupts their fight, reforms the Hōken and spirits the sword away. While Gald's refusal to have their help caused Rian to mistrust him to the point of fighting over the Hōken, she and Ryuga decide to let Gald be after seeing the protective talisman Haruna made for her brother. While Gald grudgingly acknowledges Rian and Ryuga afterwards when they saved his sister before rescuing him, he still insists on acting on his own while warns the duo not to interfere. It isn't until that he himself got captured and nearly having to kill himself in a bid to take down Jinga, subsequently being saved by Rian and Ryuga who goes to his rescue, that he finally acknowledges his own limits, decides to put his trust on the two of them, and enlists their help in completing his mission. While he still holds enmity against all Makai Knights in general, he decides to deem Ryuga and Daigo to be trustworthy ones.

Gald is dressed predominantly in black like all Makai practitioners. His garb consists of an elaborated black robe, adorned with navy blue belts over his left shoulder and a short sleeve on his right which is mostly red. The puppet through which Haruna communicates with him is pinned to the right breast of his robe, which is thought initially to be a Madōgu. Gald is a formidable Makai Priest, well-versed in martial arts and adept in combat magic, with his signature move being very short-range teleportation, which he can also bestow temporarily on others through use of tags. As a descendant of the Homura Village, where two of his ancestors were responsible for sealing Radan, he is knowledgeable on the use of the Hōken, as well as sealing techniques and rituals required to seal Radan.

Gald is portrayed by Hiroki Nakajima (中島 広稀, Nakajima Hiroki). As a child, he is portrayed by Rion Ichimura (市村 涼風, Ichimura Rion).

=== Haruna ===
Haruna (ハルナ) is a Makai Priestess and Gald's physically frail younger sister, the two having fled to Homura village when Moyuru sacrificed himself to hold off the rogue Makai Knight, Jinga, and rogue Makai Priestess, Amily, slaughtering everyone in their day. She is forgiving, observant, and in general more serious in personality than Gald, often seen urging him to get on with his work and giving advice in Makai-related matters. Despite having her home village slaughtered by a rogue Makai Knight, she does not share Gald's encompassing hatred for all Makai Knights. Because of her frailty, which at times makes even standing up on her own incredibly difficult, Haruna is confined to a house hidden deep in Yousei forest while using a Madōgu-like puppet made from scrap materials to stay in contact with her brother while he is away.

She was entrusted with the Hōken as, through Gald's unpleasant encounters with Ryuga and Rian, he deems it too dangerous to keep with him. After seeing how Ryuga and Rian put Gald's well-being before their mission, vowing to help rescue him despite having no need to do so, she decides to entrust the Hōken to the duo while taken under Ryume's care. She later resides in Tienda de Bolts and acts as support for Ryuga and company using a mystical book, which is able to project maps and floorplans, and special charms that serve the same function as Gald's puppet. Later, and at Gald's insistence, Haruna temporarily gives up being a Makai Priestess and enters normal civilian life, enrolling in a high school under the name Haruna Homura (火群 ハルナ, Homura Haruna). While at the school, she befriends the astronomy club and the delinquent student Meguru. A shape-shifting Horror infiltrates the school one day and Daigo Akizuki, having disguised himself as a gym teacher to hunt the Horror, slays it as it attacks Haruna and Meguru during an astronomy club event. The next day, Haruna leaves the school after saying her goodbyes to Meguru and returns to being a Makai Priestess, resolving that her dream is to protect the hopes and dreams of others.

Haruna is portrayed by Moka Komatsu (小松 もか, Komatsu Moka). As a child, she is portrayed by Hisui Kimura (木村 日翠, Kimura Hisui).

=== Daichi ===
Daichi (代知) is a Makai Priest who once served the Senate and aims to be a Darkness Slasher. He idolizes Bikuu, despite her being the one who executed his mother. He wishes to become like a Darkness Slasher like Bikuu despite her coldly rebuffing his repeated attempts to get closer to her. Daichi has an alaya-vijnana mark, a rare crescent-shaped birthmark on the back of his right hand. The mark is known to be a good luck charm and signifies one who possesses great potential. Daichi has the ability to use a powerful fire spell, the same spell his mother killed another Priest to obtain, which can dispel powerful darkness. He later learns how to use the Soul Insertion spell under Bikuu's tutelage.

Daichi is portrayed by Kenta Suga (須賀 健太, Suga Kenta).

=== Kagome ===
Kagome (カゴメ) is a Makai Priestess. She has a small angelic fairy-like being named Hanatsumi (花罪), who is sealed in a bamboo container when not summoned. Both siblings were raised in an impoverished household of low status within the Makai community. Lacking both talent and training, Okina and Kagome were weak, mostly self-taught priests who only became capable of taking down Horrors when they became young adults. Nevertheless, she looked up to her brother and trained as hard as she was able to, eventually developing a specialty in erecting personal barriers. She is capable of erecting barriers both on herself and on others, and are strong enough to repel repeated strong attacks. Knowing full well that she is incapable of taking on Edel on her own, she initially goes to challenge Rei and to attempt to kill Alice, as doing so proves relatively easier. She is taken in by Bakura after Rei defeats her, and begin to look up to Rekka soon after meeting her. She then cooperates with Rei and Rekka in their hunt for Edel. Seizing an opening during the trio's battle with Edel, she sacrifices her life to defeat the Dragon Knight. After Kagome's death, Hanatsumi goes along with Rekka.

Kagome is portrayed by Yuria Haga (芳賀 優里亜, Haga Yuria), who also plays Hanatsumi. As a child, she is portrayed by Runa Takahashi (高橋 月, Takahashi Runa).

=== Fusa ===
Fusa (楓沙, Fūsa) is a Makai Priestess and Jinga's partner. Her origins and how she ends up with Jinga is yet-to-revealed at this point. While looking meek and having nothing to suggest her being a capable combatant, she is indeed a professional, capable support to Jinga. Her spells tend towards restraining Horrors instead of attacking them head on, creating openings for Jinga to land the killing blows. Her position otherwise is more like that of a clean-up crew in the field rather than a sidekick, usually tasked with evacuating civilians caught in the fray, wiping their memories of the ordeal, casting spells to make sure civilians around do not find them out of place, and so on, while Jinga often goes on to fight the Horror alone. Fusa is often seen concerned of Jinga's mental wellbeing, but never intervenes so much that it would annoy his partner. It is later revealed in the ordeal with the Horror Fons that her concern for Jinga runs deeper than initially speculated, as she is seen doubting whether she had made the wrong choice becoming a partner of Jinga, who is now psychologically damaged and deemed incapable to operate at his full capacity, as well as her own abilities as a Makai Priestess. She nevertheless chooses to stand by her Knight and her choice, dispelling the hold Fons' intention of amplifying her inner darkness and have her possessed.

Fusa begins to take notice of Shijo's absence and Jinga's occasional mood swing after that unusual night, suspecting that Jinga might be suffering from dissociative identity disorder and confiding this to Yoyu. Regardless, unaware of the evils committed by Jinga's past life, Fusa remained by Jinga's side as he ends up on the run from Kerus over his refusal to turn himself in for an inquiry of his power. Fusa attempts to reason with him for Toma's sake, only to be killed by Jinga as he accused her of betraying him.

Fusa is portrayed by Yuuka Kouri (向里 憂香, Kōri Yūka). As a child, she is portrayed by Rion Hyodo (兵頭 莉音, Hyōdō Rion).

=== Yoyu ===
Yoyu (葉祐, Yōyū) is a Makai Priest, Mizuto's longtime friend, and Fusa's mentor. Yoyu wipes Toma's traumatic memories of Jinga's patricide and has the boy in his care for half a year before returning him to his brother. Despite the fact that Mizuto having turned into a Horror and killed his wife, Yoyu nonetheless chooses to stand by his old friend, asserting to Jinga that Mizuto is not such a weak man. He develops the hypothesis that Mizuto was stabbed with a dagger tainted with dark qi and forcefully turned into a Horror, and voices this out to Jinga when they meet again. He also learns from Fusa that Jinga might be suffering from dissociative identity disorder.

Yoyu is portrayed by Shigemitsu Ogi (小木 茂光, Ogi Shigemitsu).

=== Koyori ===
Koyori (コヨリ) is a Makai Priestess assigned to Creacity and Souma Shirahane's childhood friend. Though relatively skilled in physical combat, she is still young and inexperienced when it comes to casting spells and no match for a Horror on her own.

Koyori is portrayed by Miko Nakazawa (中澤 実子, Nakazawa Miko).

=== Lector ===
Lector (レクトル, Rekutoru) is a Makai Priest from the south. His left arm is petrified due to the use of a forbidden technique in the past, until it returns to normal thanks to Rian.

Lector is portrayed by Taichi Kodama (こだま たいち, Kodama Taichi).

=== Elmina ===
Elmina (エルミナ, Erumina) is a Dragon Tribe Makai Priestess and lady-in-waiting to Ryume.

Elmina is portrayed by Kanon Miyahara (宮原 華音, Miyahara Kanon).

=== Hiden ===
Hiden (ヒデン) is a Dragon Tribe Makai Priestess and tribal leader and the closest lady-in-waiting to Ryume. She is like a mother to Elmina, Riseru, and Siena. She is killed by the Horror Aquas.

Hiden is portrayed by Yukari Tachibana (橘 ゆかり, Tachibana Yukari).

=== Riseru and Siena ===
Riseru (リセル) and Siena (シエナ, Shiena) are Dragon Tribe Makai Priestesses and ladies-in-waiting to Ryume.

Riseru and Siena are portrayed by Asumi Hiraoka (平岡 明純, Hiraoka Asumi) and Ayano Kubota (窪田 彩乃, Kubota Ayano) respectively.

=== Minor Makai Priests ===
- Ouka (黄花, Ōka) and Manju (満寿): Makai Priestesses and the aides of Garai. Portrayed by ANN and Saori (沙織) respectively.
- Ratess (ラテス, Ratesu): A Makai Priest serving the Senate who is extremely prideful due to his lack of inner darkness and strict adherence to the rules, also harboring a hatred for Makai Knights, perceiving them to be conceited just because they are the ones to hunt Horrors. Meeting Kouga while given the task to deliver a Spirit Beast pelt to other Makai Priests, Ratess voices his apparent dislike for Kouga while stating his ideals that in the business of eliminating Horrors, individual strength matters little. However, Ratess is later revealed to be in league with Sigma, identifying with his ideal of removing the Makai Knights and dream of the day where Makai Priests will rule everything again. He kept the Spirit Beast pelt and personally delivered it to Sigma along with the Madō Brushes of other Makai Priests dedicated to their cause. However, refusing to hand over the Madō Train's key when asked, Ratess is murdered by Sigma, stating that he has no intention of becoming king and that Ratess is just as arrogant as the Knights they both resent, and thus has no right to live. Portrayed by Houka Kinoshita (木下 ほうか, Kinoshita Hōka).
- Mio (ミオ): A mute Makai Priestess who was a good friend of Sigma and Leo, seen only in flashbacks. After Sigma left when denied the title of Lord, Mio chose to look for him and became his assistant in the construction of Idea. During her research, she came across records of the Horror Gyanon and expressed her fearful dismay of Sigma intending to use its corpse as Idea's core. Though she visited Leo to state her fears of this venture, Mio is devastated later upon learning that a large amount of human souls are needed to power Idea. Sending Leo a message about his brother's intentions, Mio attempted to destroy Gyannon. However, though it pained him, Sigma murdered her with Leo arriving too late. Since then, Leo kept Mio's Madō Brush on his person. Portrayed by Sayaka Yoshino (吉野 紗香, Yoshino Sayaka).
- Rikyo (莉峡, Rikyō): Rian's father. He went along with Burai and Sari in the expedition to retrieve Madō Horror Plants and was killed by a newly sired Sonshi. He entrusts Rian to Burai before dying. Portrayed by Ryuki Nishimoto (西本 竜樹, Nishimoto Ryūki).
- Sari (沙莉): Rian's aunt and Rikyo's older sister. She went along with Burai and Rikyo in the expedition to retrieve Madō Horror Plants and was the first human to be devoured by a newly sired Sonshi, awakening his new nature as a Madō Horror. Portrayed by Misaki Saisho (最所 美咲, Saisho Misaki).
- Ouma (オウマ, Ōma): A Makai Priest and a childhood friend of Burai and Hakana. He visited the Tower of Heroic Spirits together with Burai and Hakana when he was a child. When Hakana claimed that she heard the Garo armor's plea to restore its radiance, unlike Burai who did not doubt her, he did not believe one bit of it. Years later, he was contacted by Burai soon after Rian's adoption to take her to Kantai. Noting something was off with his friend, he managed to stop Burai from killing himself in the nick of time. Portrayed by Toru Masuoka (益岡 徹, Masuoka Tōru).
- Sougen (壮幻, Sōgen): A great Makai Priest who sacrificed his own life to seal Higari long ago. Portrayed by Makoto Ito (伊藤 慎, Itō Makoto).
- Akari (アカリ): A Makai Priestess and Eiji Busujima's lover who died of an incurable disease two years ago, having met Raiga as a child who gave her a bell that she passed over to Busujima. Prior to her death, Busujima attempted to transfer Akari's soul into Mayuri in a desperate attempt to save her life. Though the ritual failed, Busujima mistook a half-awake Mayuri's attempt to ease him as a response from his lover before learning in the present that her soul long departed. Portrayed by Rei Yoshii (吉井 怜, Yoshii Rei).
- Raiji (雷侍) and Fuji (風侍, Fūji): A pair of Ryume's masked bodyguards. Raiji is portrayed by Hiroto Tanaka (田中 大登, Tanaka Hiroto) in the film Garo: Gold Storm Sho, Daiki Suzuki (鈴木 大樹, Suzuki Daiki) in the television series Garo: Gold Storm Sho, Takuya Matsufuji (松藤 拓也, Matsufuji Takuya) in Garo: Makai Retsuden, and Shinji Oosawa (大澤 信児, Ōsawa Shinji) in Garo: Kami no Kiba, and voiced by Tomohiro Fujitaka (藤高 智大, Fujitaka Tomohiro). Fuji is portrayed by Minoru Tomita in the film Garo: Gold Storm Sho, Hiroto Tanaka in the television series Garo: Gold Storm Sho, Yuuto Kikuchi (菊地 雄人, Kikuchi Yūto) in Garo: Makai Retsuden, Masaki Matsuda (松田 将希, Matsuda Masaki) in Garo: Kami no Kiba, and voiced by Masaomi Yamahashi (山橋 正臣, Yamahashi Masaomi).
- Gen (ゲン): A Makai Priest who was forced to unseal the Horror Radan by Jinga and Amily when it appeared they kidnapped his daughter. But once he fulfilled his purpose, Gen learns his daughter has been dead and is killed by Amily when he attempts to avenge his daughter. Portrayed by Atomu Shimojō (下條 アトム, Shimojō Atomu).
- Moyuru (モユル): A Makai Priest of Homura Village who sacrificed himself to allow Gald and Haruna a chance to escape the slaughter of their hometown by a maddened Jinga. Portrayed by Yu-ki Matsumura (松村 雄基, Matsumura Yūki).
- Hikage (ヒカゲ): A Makai Priestess of Homura Village who took in Gald and Haruna and trained them to be Makai Priests. Portrayed by Masami Okui (奥井 雅美, Okui Masami).
- Kagaya (カガヤ): A Makai Priest of Homura Village. Portrayed by Ryu Manatsu (真夏 竜, Manatsu Ryū).
- Kisara (キサラ), Zūna (ズーナ), and Yumeka (ユメカ): Makai Priestesses from the Seiran Valley who transported a Spirit Beast pelt to Homura Village together with Amily. While Zūna and Yumeka were dissatisfied with having Amily tag along, seeing her as little more than a burden, Kisara stood by her and often defended her from the other two's chiding in their journey. Portrayed by Hiromi Eguchi (江口 ヒロミ, Eguchi Hiromi), Miduki Serizawa (芹澤 みづき, Serizawa Mizuki), and Tomomi Tojo (東條 公美, Tōjō Tomomi) respectively.
- Okina (オキナ): A Makai Priest and Kagome's older brother. Both siblings were raised in an impoverished household of low status within the Makai community. Lacking both talent and training, Okina and Kagome were weak, mostly self-taught priests who only became capable of taking down Horrors when they became young adults. Despite the harsh circumstances since childhood, Okina nonetheless trained diligently and became his sister's mentor. Seeing potential in Kagome, he seek ways to enhance her sister's power and stumbled upon records of the Dragon Knight. He then hatched a plan to steal Dragon Knight Edel's coffin to awake the Dragon Knight, in order to use the powers of dragons in order to strengthen Kagome. Ironically, disgusted by his wishes to defend humanity, he is soon killed by Edel after the Dragon Knight awakened. Portrayed by Ippei Osako (大迫 一平, Ōsako Ippei). As a teenager, he is portrayed by Towa Fukuoka (福岡 永遠, Fukuoka Towa).
- Jiru (ジル), Gedo (ゲド), and Yura (ユラ): Makai Priests serving under Rekka who guard the entrance of the junkyard of Madōgu where the dragon egg is. They are killed by Edel. Portrayed by Naoki Iyamoto (辞本 直樹, Iyamoto Naoki), Yuta Nishihara (西原 悠太, Nishihara Yūta), and Akihiro Yoshino (吉野 晃弘, Yoshino Akihiro) respectively.
- Ugai (鵜飼): A Makai Priest who is capable of locating Horrors faster than the Watchdogs. Portrayed by Ryo Ikeda (池田 良, Ikeda Ryō).
- Hakkei (八珪): A Makai Priest who teams up with three Makai Knights including Rozan to take Jinga and Toma to the Watchdog castle. Portrayed by Kouichi Yoshinari (吉成 浩一, Yoshinari Kōichi).
- Priestess Kadō (伽堂法師, Kadō-hōshi): A Makai Priestess and Azami's foster mother. She tried to guide Azami to the correct path but ended up being killed by her 20 years ago. Portrayed by Yuko Daike (大家 由祐子, Daike Yūko).
- Sugō (スゴウ): A Makai Priest and a great guide of Shidōin. 20 years ago, he was killed along with Nairu and Agiru by Hagiri. Portrayed by Bob Suzuki (ボブ 鈴木, Bobu Suzuki).
- Nairu (ナイル) and Agiru (アギル): Makai Priestesses and the aides of Sugō. 20 years ago, they were killed along with Sugō by Hagiri. Portrayed by Yuri Hori (堀 有里, Hori Yuri) and Miho Jin (神 実穂, Jin Miho) respectively.
- Shippu (疾風, Shippū) and Reppu (烈風, Reppū): A pair of Mutsugi's masked bodyguards. Portrayed by Yuuya Iwataki (イワタキ ユウヤ, Iwataki Yūya) and Yuuya Barano (萩野 祐矢, Barano Yūya) respectively.

== Makai Order ==
These figures are composed of priestesses of Watchdog (番犬所, Bankenjo) castles and the Senate (元老院, Genrōin).

=== Grace ===
Grace (グレス, Guresu) is a high priestess of the Senate during Kouga's time as the Golden Knight and the person who gives Kouga his orders as a Knight of the Senate.

Grace is portrayed by Yuriko Hishimi (ひし美 ゆり子, Hishimi Yuriko).

=== Jiiru ===
Jiiru (ジイル) is the current priestess of the Blue Watchdog castle during Raiga's time as the Golden Knight.

Jiiru is portrayed by Asana Mamoru (護 あさな, Mamoru Asana).

=== Meme ===
Meme (メメ) is a messenger from the Senate that has the appearance of a masked little girl.

Meme is portrayed by Himawari Oide.

=== Kerus ===
Kerus (ケルス, Kerusu) is the current priestess of the Watchdog castle during Jinga's time as the Glittering Shadow Knight.

Kerus is portrayed by Misaki Yumoto (湯本 美咲, Yumoto Misaki).

=== Rumido and Ramedo ===
Rumido (ルミド) and Ramedo (ラメド) are a pair of aides to Kerus, who wear black paint around their eyes.

Rumido and Ramedo are portrayed by Arihiro Iwata (岩田 有弘, Iwata Arihiro) and Daisuke Sato (佐藤 大介, Satō Daisuke) respectively.

== Other protagonists ==
=== Kaoru Mitsuki ===
Kaoru Mitsuki (御月 カオル, Mitsuki Kaoru) is the narrator and the female protagonist of the first two series, an aspiring 22-year-old artist who always having trouble making money. She is the daughter of a painter Yūji Mitsuki (御月 由児, Mitsuki Yūji; portrayed by Katsuyuki Murai) and his wife Karin (かりん; portrayed by Asako Kobayashi), the former having written a children's picture book based on his encounter with Taiga. Though she had no memory of the event, Kaoru was chosen by Barago as the medium to summon Messiah and serve as her host in the human world.

Meeting Kouga at the start of the first series, Kaoru ends up being infected by Horror blood with Kouga sparing her life instead of killing her. Unaware of her condition, or Kouga's reasons, Kaoru ends up unknowingly helping the Makai Knight at times as Horror bait. To keep taps on her, due to her bad luck in attracting Horrors, Kouga has Kaoru wear a ring created from Zaruba's being. After being evicted from her house and accidentally making her friend Asuna sick while temporarily freeloading, Kaoru moves into the Saejima estate while intending to earn her keep. Having developed feelings for Kouga, Kaoru is devastated when she found out Kouga used her as Horror bait before eventually forgiving him prior to the Makai Knight saving her life with the Varrancas Fruit. However, while trying to complete the last page of her father's book, Barago abducts Kaoru to enact the ritual to summon Messiah before Kouga save her and thwarts the scheme. Soon after, Kaoru leaves for Italy to further her art studies, finishing the last page of one of his father's Golden Knight picture book and giving it to Kouga. Though it was never revealed to the audience what the last page looks like, it nonetheless brought Kouga to tears.

She was seen painting a picture near the end of Garo Special: Byakuya no Maju in the Saejima estate, welcoming Kouga home and seen holding hands with him. By the time of Garo: Makai Senki, she becomes a regular visitor to the Saejima estate and works on publishing her own picture book based on the inspiration of her experiences throughout the second series, The White Spirit Beast and the Mysterious Forest. Having gone through many hardships with Kouga, she has come to understand him enough to be able see through his stoicism much like Gonza, and now far more willing to put up with his antics. Forced to part ways with Kouga again when he leaves to uphold his end of the bargain with Gajari, Kaoru eventually sees Kouga after his return two months later.

In Garo: Makai no Hana, it is revealed that Kaoru and Kouga married and had a son, Raiga. But while Raiga was still a child, Kaoru was suddenly abducted into an unknown realm, with Kouga going out soon after to rescue her. Though believing his parents died, Raiga learns that his father is still alive when he inherited both the Garo armor and title, with hope that he may eventually reunite with his mother as well.

By the time of Garo: Gekkou no Tabibito and its mini-series prequel, Kaoru and Kouga finally reunite somewhere at Promised Land, but the-then animated Kiba Armor unexpectedly appears, possessed by Barago's surviving evil qi. It was after seemingly defeated Kiba she and her husband discovered that not only Eyrith being the one who separated her from her family, but also their son fight a losing battle against the legendary Horror, thus necessitating Kouga to send Zaruba to his son to aide him to become the next Garo. As soon as the recovered Kiba set his sight on Raiga, she assists Mayuri in sending the Garo armor purified by their combined feelings to Raiga while Kouga, Raiga, and the revived Taiga deal the Dark Knight.

Kaoru Mitsuki is portrayed by Mika Hijii (肘井 美佳, Hijii Mika). As a child, she is portrayed by Kanami Katchi (甲地 夏波, Katchi Kanami).

=== Gonza Kurahashi ===
Gonza Kurahashi (倉橋 ゴンザ, Kurahashi Gonza) the butler of the Saejima household who has served the family for three generations and the only family Kouga had after his parents died. Gonza attends to all butler related duties like cleaning the house and cooking, while also advises his masters on certain matters. He helped raise and assist Kouga with his training since childhood. Though having been exposed to the Makai world for over fifty years (between Taiga, Kouga and Raiga), Gonza is a regular person without any form of Makai training other than the ability to read the old Makai script, thus is not considered a member of the Makai community proper.

Gonza is also on good terms with Kaoru and is usually seen encouraging Kouga's relationship with her. He was featured in Garo Side Story as "God of Pictures", but the sequence was part of Kaoru's dream. Gonza was featured in Garo Special: Byakuya no Maju as his usual self looking after the household. In Garo: Makai no Hana, it is revealed that an aged Gonza still works for the Saejima household, now under Kouga and Kaoru's son Raiga. Just like he did with Kouga, Gonza raised Raiga by himself and helped in the boy's training after his parents disappeared. He is also very friendly with Mayuri, and like Raiga, opts to see her as a person rather than just a Madōgu.

Despite being a servant of the Saejima household, Gonza often does far more than is required of him and would happily go to lengths to assist his masters as well as the stay-in guests, and sees everyone in the household as family. In return, the masters of the Saejima household all treat him as their own family rather than only as a servant.

Despite hardly seen anywhere outside the Saejima estate, Gonza does have friends and acquaintances, at least within the Makai community, as he is known to be an old friend to Anna, a retired Makai Priestess who is currently an owner of a restaurant and a chef, whom he had known since his time working for Taiga.

Gonza Kurahashi is portrayed by Yukijiro Hotaru (螢 雪次朗, Hotaru Yukijirō).

=== Asami Shinohara ===
Asami Shinohara (篠原 亜佐美, Shinohara Asami) is Kaoru's best friend. She always helped Kaoru's financial problems by giving her financial tips, loans, and job references. When Kaoru lost her apartment Asami reluctantly allowed Kaoru to move in for a few days. Kaoru made a dish for Asami as a way to appease her, but made her sick instead. Asami was sent to the hospital, which at the time was filled with Horrors, but she was not devoured. Asami eventually was phased out of the story line and only appeared once in a while to show she's still in contact with Kaoru. She returned as the "God of Painting" in Garo Side Story.

Asami Shinohara is portrayed by Mina Fukui (福井 未菜, Fukui Mina).

=== Shizuka ===
Shizuka (静香) is the deceased lover of Rei. She too was an orphan and was taken into a lavish estate alongside Rei. Shizuka's origins aren't known, but for some unexplained reason she was killed by Barago. It was Shizuka's death that drove Rei to a path of vengeance.

Shizuka is portrayed by Alisa (有紗, Arisa).

=== Rui Suzaki ===
Rui Suzaki (洲崎 類, Suzaki Rui) is a young girl who moved to Vol City with her mother Sachiko (幸子), her grandmother Yoshie (良恵), and her little brother Genki (元気), interested in a program that offers free housing to newcomers, unaware that it is actually a trap to lure outsiders to be preyed upon by the Horrors. Despite Takeru's warnings, Rui and her family insists to take part in the program and after learning the truth, they are rescued by Ryuga and his companions. Rian has Rui and her family's memories altered so that they forget what happened and believe that they were rejected by the program, but Sonshi appears to them as they leave the city and instructs them to return. However, Rui remembers about Takeru and manages to survive by jumping from the car while the rest of his family is taken away to Kaneshiro Foods where their souls were sealed away in capsules with their bodies incinerated. Found by Burai and the others, Rui's memories are then completely altered to have no memory of her family as she starts working at a flower shop. Despite being ordered to not interact with her anymore for fear of triggering the emergence of her original memories, Takeru approaches Rui, becomes her friend and looks out for her while later enabling her family to rest in peace after learning of their fate. Despite having her memories completely altered, bits and pieces of her behavior and habits during the time spent with her family still lingers, proven for her habit of gazing at the moon. While she herself currently unsure why she likes looking up at the moon so much, Takeru quotes that it is due to the habit bringing up a sense of nostalgia, as that is what she used to do with her family often.

Soon after Zedom is finished off, she is seen with a florist stall of her own, where Takeru goes to check on her. Now with her memories relating to the Makai erased again like everyone else in Vol City, she could no longer recognize Takeru, but in order to preserve his time with her, he vows to live properly from here on out nonetheless.

Rui Suzaki is portrayed by Nozomi Maeda (前田 希美, Maeda Nozomi).

=== Bakura ===
Bakura (バクラ) is the one-armed owner of the bar Lupo (ルーポ, Rūpo), which Rei frequents. He is aware of the Makai Knight's duties and acts as his support in a relationship similar to that of Gonza and the Saejima clan. Bakura allegedly lost his arm during a run-in with a Horror. From Zero: Dragon Blood onward, he wears an artificial arm containing a Madō Brush.

Bakura is portrayed by Guadalcanal Taka (ガダルカナル・タカ, Gadarukanaru Taka).

=== Mayuri ===
Though referred to as a Madōgu Magō Lily-Type (魔号百合型, Magō Yuri-gata), Mayuri (マユリ) is actually a human who was born while her Makai Priestess mother was possessed by a Horror. Her mother's lingering thoughts for her prevented the possession to spill over to her while she was still in the womb. The ordeal gave Mayuri the power to detect Horrors and seal them in her body - a never-before-seen ability in any human. Entrusted to Shidou, Mayuri is raised until she reached adulthood, then placed within suspended animation in a casket until her talents are needed. She is raised with her human emotions suppressed, as having emotions is widely seen by her caretakers as a liability due to the nature of her powers.

Mayuri is eventually assigned to assist Raiga in tracking down Eyrith, using her power to absorb the petrified remains of the nine Horrors that formed Eyrith's prison. Despite appearing to lack emotional expression and find it hard to comprehend emotions, due to never being treated as a person before meeting Raiga, Mayuri sports a dry wit and appears to be able to dream and have preferences. Due to her emotionless upbringing, she does not care much about how she is being treated, be it as a mere object or otherwise, but both Raiga and Gonza both insist on treating her like a person nonetheless. This results in her being more expressive during her later days with the Saejima household, despite still sporting a deadpan face most of the time. Due to having never drank liquor before, Mayuri is easily inebriated (to the point of blacking out after a single sip of whiskey). She also lacks an appreciation for taste as a result of her upbringing.

By the end of the series, the ordeal of sealing Eyrith left her severely weakened and powers extremely unstable, requiring a 'resetting' ritual which would, as a side effect, wipe her memories, else she would soon die. However, now acknowledging herself to be a human and wants to live as a human, Mayuri begs in tears to be allowed to die as a human instead of carrying on as a Madōgu. She is then persuaded by Raiga, Crow, Gonza, Shidou and Bikuu to go with the ritual, assuring her that they will be by her side and do their best to bring her back as a human again. She is left comatose and in the care of the Saejima household for an unspecified amount of time after the ritual. When she comes to, she greets Raiga with a smile for the first time, suggesting that she retained most, if not all, of her memories, as well as have her emotions 'unlocked'.

She seals Horrors by means of a cage within her. She is warned to never open the cage on her own, as it would severely weaken and even kill her. However, she crossed the line due to her sympathy for Barg as a fellow Madōgu, wanting to seal the creature to give it peace, causing her to weaken over time. Her weakened state finally causes the cage to reach critical point when she seals Idora, causing the newly sealed Horror's essence to spill. This causes Mayuri to start to hallucinate and develop a lust for blood. Fortunately, Raiga manages to dive into her consciousness in time and slay Idora once again, preventing the Horror from possessing Mayuri and allowing the cage to be re-stabilized.

In Garo: Makai Retsuden, Mayuri is shown to be somewhat more expressive and open than before, though she still retains a generally stoic, analytical demeanor. She finds a friend and confidant in the retired Makai Priestess Anna, who encourages Mayuri to visit as often as possible.

Mayuri is portrayed by Natsumi Ishibashi (石橋 菜津美, Ishibashi Natsumi). As a child, she is portrayed by Himawari Oide (生出 陽葵, Oide Himawari). As a baby, she is portrayed by Shihona Seki (関 志穂奈, Seki Shihona).

=== Anna ===
Anna (アンナ) is a retired Makai Priestess who is a longtime friend of Gonza's, referring to him affectionately as Gon-chan. She is the owner of the western-style restaurant Kitchen Anna. Gonza seeks her help in order to learn how to enable Mayuri enjoy meals like normal people do and see her smile. While she is helpful and lends her kitchen to Gonza to make an ideal dish—one that she finds to be superb indeed, Gonza laments still that it would not be enough to make Mayuri happy and realizes that there is more to it than just cooking. She breaks out her old Madō Brush and equipment at Gonza's request to infuse a soup bowl with a swimming Demon World Dragon illustration, a trick that works successfully to make Mayuri smile while enjoying a meal, while also showing that despite having retired for some time, she has not lost her touch as a Makai Priestess.

In Garo: Makai Retsuden, it is revealed that she runs not only the restaurant but also the tea shop Cafe Anna.

Anna is portrayed by Keiko Matsuzaka (松坂 慶子, Matsuzaka Keiko).

=== D Ringo ===
D Ringo (D・リンゴ) is an old man who possesses many Makai items. As revealed in Garo: Makai Retsuden, D Ringo was formerly a Makai Priest who took to robbing abandoned Makai sites for treasure. Once such event had him cross paths with Ryume when he and Ginji nearly caused a mass Horror infestation of the surrounding area. Originally running a mobile kebab shop in Line City, D Ringo later opens a miscellaneous goods shop called Tienda de Bolsa that ends up becoming a meeting place and base of operations for Ryuga and company during the events of Garo: Goldstorm Sho. He tends to dislike getting involved in Horror-related matters despite having extensive knowledge of the Makai arts and is known to be something of a cheapskate. During Radan's attack on the city, D Ringo uses a guitar-like Madō Brush powered by Agō to protect the city.

D Ringo is portrayed by Shigeru Izumiya (泉谷 しげる, Izumiya Shigeru), while a younger D Ringo is portrayed by Takuya Ishida (石田 卓也, Ishida Takuya).

=== Yukihime ===
Yukihime (ユキヒメ) is D Ringo's partner, who speaks solely in nonsensical metaphors that only those who know her understand. She possesses superhuman strength, able to destroy objects many times her size with a simple punch. D Ringo addresses her by the affectionate nickname "Akachan" (赤ちゃん; lit. "baby").

Yukihime is portrayed by Momoko Kuroki (黒木 桃子, Kuroki Momoko).

=== Ginji ===
Ginji (ギンジ) is D Ringo's longtime partner in crime in their youth, appearing whatever D Ringo requires something as he is indebted to him.

Ginji is portrayed by Kenichi Nagira (なぎら 健壱, Nagira Ken'ichi), while a younger Ginji is portrayed by Wataru Koura (高良 亘, Kōra Wataru)

=== Alice Hiromi ===
Alice Hiromi (尋海 アリス, Hiromi Arisu) is a girl who likes photography and is attracted to beautiful things and scenes. Her parents died when she was little. She is looking for the Dragon Egg. Despite apparently being an ordinary human, she possesses a moderate awareness of the Makai world and Horrors and is drawn to Rei for being a Makai Knight despite his attempts to push her away. Because she is the one who sealed the cage around the Dragon Egg, her handprint is the only one that can unlock the cage again, making her a target for Edel. Edel later kidnaps her and forces her to release the egg, but she escapes with it and delivers it to Rei and Rekka. When she is told that someone from the Senate will arrive to dispose of the egg, she takes it and runs away. When the Dragon Egg finally hatches, she takes it upon herself care for the newborn dragon, which she names Lupu (ループ, Rūpu) after Bakura's bar, Lupo. Lupu, having imprinted on Alice immediately after birth, instinctively follows and protects her, possessing magical abilities on par with a moderately powerful Makai Priest, able to spit flame and teleport itself and others at will despite being barely a day old.

Alice Hiromi is portrayed by Kokoro Aoshima (青島 心, Aoshima Kokoro). As a child, she is portrayed by Ran (蘭).

=== Kurehi ===
Kurehi (クレヒ) is a mysterious woman who frequents the bar Lupo, commonly seen silently playing solitaire.

Kurehi is portrayed by Kuran (紅蘭).

=== Toma Mikage ===
Toma Mikage (御影 刀眞, Mikage Tōma) is Mikage's younger brother, having been trained from childhood to become Makai Knight himself. While he is physically capable, he has yet to be able to wield Soul Metal blades. Toma was present when his father Mizuto slayed his mother, accusing Jinga to be a Horror before being pushed aside by Mikage to deal the killing blow. The event traumatized Toma so much that Yoyu, a friend of the family, seals the memories regarding the event. He was under the care of Yoyu for half a year and is currently living with Mikage and Fusa. Concerned over Toma's overconfidence and inexperience with Horrors, Mikage and Fusa bring him to an abandoned building to help them in exterminating the Horrors living that. While Toma quickly steadies himself with encouragement from Mikage and Fusa, he ends up charging into the lair of the Horror Fons who restores Toma's suppressed memories.

This resulted in Toma becoming a Horror's host and acting on intent to kill Mikage to avenge their parents. But while Mikage appeared to kill him, he actually suppressed the possessing Horror with himself and everyone else believing him to have purged it from Toma's body. Mikage chooses not to wipe his brother's memories of the ordeal and he deems it important for Toma's growth, with Toma reasserting his vow to become a Makai Knight and never again to fall victim to such a situation. Nevertheless, he becomes proud of his brother's unique and never-before-seen abilities, and his status as the first exorcised human in the Makai community. But Toma eventually surrenders himself to Kerus to be properly inspected, later attacking Mikage upon learning he murdered Fusa with his Horror form awakening as a result and ends up being devoured by the fully resurrected Jinga.

Toma Mikage is portrayed by Sōshi Hagiwara (萩原 壮志, Hagiwara Sōshi).

=== Koyuri Mikage ===
Koyuri Mikage (御影 小百合, Mikage Koyuri) is Jinga and Toma's mother.

Koyuri Mikage is portrayed by Satomi Ando (安藤 聡海, Andō Satomi).

=== Fuki ===
Fuki (吹奇) is a Makai Guide (魔戒導師, Makai Dōshi) and the servant of the small shrine of the Sacred Beasts. When she was a baby, her parents were killed by Makai Guide Jadou before the fallen Makai Guide turned into a Horror's host. She holds the dormant soul of the Sacred Beast Kirin inside her body. On orders from the Watchdog, she works in cooperation with Taiga Saejima to recover the stolen compass carrying the souls of the Sacred Beasts.

Fuki is portrayed by Rika Kashima (神嶋 里花, Kashima Rika).

=== Monma ===
Monma (モンマ) is the elder of small shantytown Sagan (サガン).

Monma is portrayed by Tsurutaro Kataoka (片岡 鶴太郎, Kataoka Tsurutarō).

=== Ayura ===
Ayura (アユラ) is a wanderer and former Makai Priestess. She was also Lector's apprentice.

Ayura is portrayed by Kyoka Minakami (水上 京香, Minakami Kyōka).

== Antagonists ==
=== Barago ===
Barago (バラゴ) is the main antagonist of the first series. Barago is the only Makai Knight who transforms without a Soul Metal weapon, but instead a Madō necklace, blowing on it to activate it, then swinging it to become the Dark Knight. Unlike other Makai Knights, Barago's Death Metal (デスメタル, Desu Metaru) armor is organic-looking due to the Horrors he has absorbed.

Barago was the son of a Makai Knight and a Makai Priestess and had a happy childhood. When his mother fell ill, Barago intended to protect his mother and thus decided to become a Makai Knight himself through harsh training. However, forced to watch his mother turn into a Horror before his father kills her, Barago left home to find a himself another teacher, as he was unsure if his training with his father was of any use. News of his father's death came to him soon after he left home, but he felt no sadness as he thinks that his father died because he was weak. To that end, he became a talented Makai disciple of Taiga Saejima, hoping to become the next Garo. But refused the right, Barago's desperation for power grew and Messiah heard his need, appearing before him when he enter a forgotten lair filled with forbidden techniques. Messiah proceeded to offer Barago her power in return of enacting the legend of Kiba the Dark Knight (暗黒騎士・呀（キバ）, Ankoku Kishi Kiba), giving him both the name and armor of Kiba.

After enduring the Soul armor's time limit, managing to will himself out of his Lost Soul Beast Kiba (心滅獣身呀, Shinmetsu Jūshin Kiba) form by absorbing a Horror, Barago proceeds to assimilate the attributes of Horrors he defeats through absorption; however, this came at the cost of his own humanity. Subsequent usage of the forbidden magics tainted the Soul Armor and reconfigured its form with more Horror-like features and twisted Barago's soul. It was then that Taiga was forced to take action against Barago, pursuing his corrupt disciple and engaged him in combat. Though he fatally wounded his former mentor, Barago was scarred with the "Mark of Death" as Taiga's final move in hope that the scar's effect would kill him in a few days. But the Horrors dwelling inside Barago's body enabled him to elude death, though his face became horribly deformed. It was by that time that Barago came to the realization that he despised Makai Knights more than Horrors as he devoured them as well.

Barago soon began to devise a plan to speed up his Horror consumption by creating his own Horror gates by infusing bits of his darkness into objects. Because of his amplified strength over years of reaching his quota of a thousand absorbed Horrors, he became stronger than any Makai Knight and eventually defeated his nemesis Bado. With his ultimate goal nearly achieved, Barago proceeds to find an ideal girl to serve as a living gateway for Messiah to possess: a girl of age six born on the sixth day of the sixth month. He found Kaoru soon after and marks her to become his gateway. Soon after, Barago used a potion he stole from Rei's foster father to change his face and oversee Kaoru's progress as her personal psychiatrist and counselor Karune Ryuzaki (龍崎 駈音, Ryūzaki Karune). It was by this time that Barago learned that Bado left a means of redemption in his being and was ordered by Messiah to remove all traces of it from his body.

The Eastern Watchdog also allied themselves with Barago to help bring forth Messiah, giving him the Ankokuzan halberd to single-handedly absorb a giant Horror that overwhelmed Garo and Zero. When Barago's arrangements are nearly complete, he kidnaps Kaoru to begin the summoning ritual to call forth Messiah. He proceeds to reveal his life story to Kaoru before Messiah takes her over and has Barago severe his ties with his mother in order to destroy the very last trace of light. However, now beyond redemption, Barago learns too late that he was just being used by the Horror as Messiah "ate" Barago with little resistance. But his animated Kiba armor returned to the living world after Messiah was defeated by Kouga. Now nothing more than a Horror, Kiba battles Garo and Zero, only to be destroyed by the former in a one-on-one sword fight.

In the novel Garo: Ankoku Makai Kishi Hen, after being eaten by Messiah and dying, a disheartened Barago reunited with Taiga and Amon and repented his sins. To atone for his sins, he helped summon the Garo armor during Kouga's battle with Kiba. Later, he was forgiven and was reincarnated into the past as a Makai Knight's son, who ran into Kaoru in Italy. In addition, it is revealed that the name "Barago" means "hope" in the old Makai language as with Garo.

During the events of Garo: Gekkou no Tabibito, Kiba, actually the surviving evil qi of the armor, was revealed to have been wandering as a spiritual entity, able to possess a corpse, ever since he was awakened by Raiga's first cry. Kiba's main goal is to summon the powerful armor that the legendary strongest Makai Knight with the title of Ouga the Hawk Emperor Knight (鷹皇騎士・王牙（オウガ）, Ōkō Kishi Ōga) (Note: The kanji that make up the name "Ouga" (王牙) are literally translated as "King Fang".) once donned, to fuse with it and become Kiba Ouga (呀王牙, Kiba Ōga). Kiba assumed the identity of a white-masked man named Shiroku (白孔) while possessing the corpse of a Makai Knight, later used as a gate for him to gain a physical form. As Shiroku, Kiba is able to create fish-like human-faced creatures, Dogls (ドグルス, Dogurusu), which are able to freeze anyone and anything they touched and to merge into a larger single entity. During his final battle with Raiga, Kouga, and Taiga, Kiba's main goal was accomplished by using the power of the Tower of Heroic Spirits, but he ended up being defeated by them.

As Kiba, he uses the Kokuenken (黒炎剣; Black Flame Sword), which can transform into the Enma Zankōken (閻魔斬光剣; Enma Light-Cleaving Sword) while he is on foot or on the back of Raigō. Kiba also once used a halberd called the Ankokuzan (暗黒斬; Darkness Slash). Kiba's Madō Horse is Raigō (雷剛). (Note: The kanji that make up the name "Raigō" (雷剛) are literally translated as "Thunderous Strength.")

Barago is portrayed by Kenichi Kobayashi (小林 健一, Kobayashi Ken'ichi), voiced by Mizuho Yoshida (吉田 瑞穂, Yoshida Mizuho) in Kiba Gaiden. As Karune Ryuzaki, he is portrayed by Masaki Kyomoto (京本 政樹, Kyōmoto Masaki). As a child, he is portrayed by Raima Hiramatsu (平松 來馬, Hiramatsu Raima). As Shiroku, he is portrayed by Satoshi Matsuda (松田 悟志, Matsuda Satoshi).

=== Three Priestesses ===
The Three Priestesses (三神官, San Shinkan) are three ancient priestesses of the Eastern Watchdog castle, they assumed the forms of three little girls in white angelic clothing. Their names starting from oldest to youngest (left to right) are Kale (ケイル, Keiru), Bell (ベル, Beru), and Rose (ローズ, Rōzu) (A pun on Cerberus). Their thoughts are so unified that they sometimes complete each other's sentences in conversations. As revealed by Jabi, the Three Priestesses were only a single human who was chosen to be the link between the Demon World and the human world. However, though receiving eternal life, the Eastern Watchdog's body decayed overtime and the spirit divided into its three current forms, bound to confinement within the heart of the Eastern Watchdog castle with only their "son" Kodama to keep them company over the centuries.

At first they performed their expected duties for Kouga, but were actually associated with Barago for the common goal of unleashing Messiah and secretly feeding him the purified Horror blades rather than perform the repatriation ceremony. During the early part of their partnership, the three misused Horror and Madō materials to try to kill those that interfere with their plans. In the process Amon was murdered and Jabi disposed of, using Rei's need to avenge his step family to kill Kouga off as well before Kiba reveals himself.

Later Barago brought a recently dead female human body to serve as a host for the Watchdog Priestesses' spirits, assuming their true forms as three old women while melding into the host body. The host, named Gulm (ガルム, Garumu; after Garm), enabled the spirits within her to leave their place in order to help Barago with his plan. Although Gulm was apparently helping Barago to obtain immortality, she was really just using him to bring Messiah into this world. After Kodama's death, Gulm expressing great sorrow over his demise and hatred when she attempts to stop Kouga from interfering with Messiah's plans, assuming her own Cerberus-style Makai armored form, Beast Gulm (獣化ガルム, Jūka Garumu) to stop the Makai Knights. As Beast Gulm. she fights using a large ring and stronger versions of Kodama's attacks. However, Zero held her at bay before she overpowers him. But in her overconfidence of the situation, Gulm leaves herself open to be impaled by Rei. After the fall of Gulm, a new Watchdog was assigned to the eastern district to direct Garo on Makai missions.

Kale, Bell, and Rose are portrayed by Keaki Watanabe (渡辺 けあき, Watanabe Keaki), Anri Okamoto (岡本 杏理, Okamoto Anri), and Yukina Kashiwa (柏 幸奈, Kashiwa Yukina) respectively, while they are voiced by Fumiko Inoue (井上 富美子, Inoue Fumiko), Machiko Kawana (川名 真知子, Kawana Machiko), and Akemi Satō (佐藤 朱, Satō Akemi) respectively. Gulm is portrayed by Kimika Yoshino (吉野 公佳, Yoshino Kimika).

=== Kodama ===
Kodama (コダマ) is the "butler" of the Three Watchdog Priestesses, Eurasian in appearance, and is their son. Kodama's position has him serve the Watchdogs, carrying out their orders and protecting them from harm. He's highly skilled in martial arts and doesn't fear taking on a Makai Priest or Makai Knight. Though he was outsmarted by Jabi in their first encounter he took advantage of a momentary distraction from Jabi and Kouga to shoot her in the back.

Though apparently unable to talk, Kodama can use his voice to summon magical destructive blue orbs, and throw them at his enemies. The longer and louder he can shout, the bigger and stronger the magical orbs will be. In his last fight, Kodama transformed himself in armored monster called Demon Beast Armored Kodama (魔獣装甲コダマ, Majū Sōkō Kodama) to fight Garo, but was easily killed by Kouga once he is possessed by his armor. His name is derived from the Japanese word meaning "echo." In the Garo Side Story, you finally see him speak; unfortunately, he talks extremely loud and fast in English, which Kaoru mistakes for the Kansai dialect.

Kodama is portrayed by Mark Musashi (マーク武蔵, Māku Musashi).

=== Elda ===
Elda (エルダ, Eruda) is a Makai Guide who supported Barago, able to predict the future with her tarot cards. In the past, she was a partner to a Makai Knight named Shinji (シンジ) and was in love with him. However, that changed when the two are sent to find the remains of the Horror Gyanon, with Elda having a sense of dread from her cards. The dread would be revealed when Shinji is slaughtered by the two Makai Knights accompanying them. Horrified, Elda is fatally wounded with her final moments filled with hatred for everyone while knowing that the Horror's corpse has been moved in secret. But when Barago arrived, killing the Makai Knights in his own search for Gyanon, he offers to save Elda. She accepted his offer to join his cause and was infused with new life from the energies of Horrors that he absorbed. After Kaoru was kidnapped, a jealous Elda was entrusted to look after the girl until Barago finished the preparations. What became of Elda after Barago's death is a mystery.

Elda is portrayed by Leah Dizon (リア・ディゾン, Ria Dizon).

=== Sigma Fudō ===
Sigma Fudō (布道 シグマ, Fudō Shiguma) is the main antagonist of Garo: Makai Senki. Though more talented than his younger twin brother Leo, influencing his brother's choice to become a Makai Priest, Sigma was denied the right to bear the Lord title as he lacked the will to protect others. Sigma felt betrayed and left his family soon after to take the path of a Makai Priest, meeting his brother years later after their father died. Though Leo offered the armor to him, Sigma refuses and reveals his intention to construct the Magōryū Idea to end the Horror menace once and for all. With the aid of his childhood friend, Mio, Sigma found a power source for Idea in the Horror Gyanon. But Sigma also started to gather large numbers of human scum as sacrifices to power his creation. Refusing to allow this, Mio attempted to destroy Gyanon with Sigma forced to kill her before he slammed his left hand onto the Horror's corpse in rage over another loved one's betrayal, causing his left arm to take on a red Horror-like appearance with a mask covering his face.

Known originally as the red-masked man (赤い仮面の男, akai kamen no otoko) when he makes his presence known to the Senate, Sigma engraves the Seal of Destruction (破滅の刻印, Hametsu no Kokuin) on Kouga and other Makai Knights like Rei and Tsubasa, the effect being that it shortens the inflicted Makai Knight's lifespan whenever they don their Makai armor, with chronic pain a side effect that intensifies each time the armor is summoned, weakening the Makai Knights gradually over time, and eventually killing them when he activates the seal. After enlisting the Horror Sedinbale to help him translate a tablet with ancient Makai writing relating to the Natural Release of the Ego Moon, Sigma uses Ratess to obtain the Spirit Pelt needed to control Gyanon before killing him for the Madō Train key to enter the True Demon World where he can get the materials needed to create Idea. Though unmasked during his fight with Kouga and Rei, everyone was under the impression that he is Leo save Kouga on the grounds that something is amiss. It was only when Leo arrives to Kouga's aid that Sigma's identity is revealed. Frustrated at another betrayal, Sigma considers Leo dead to him while developing a personal vendetta against Kouga.

Shortly afterwards, with the time now being ripe for Idea's activation with the Madō spell enhancing Awakening Moon event drawing near, Sigma tricks the Makai Knights by claiming to spare all save Kouga if they renounce their Makai Knighthood. With the Makai Knights gathered to debate this, Sigma formed a barrier around them so he can enter the True Demon World without interference. Though Kouga manage to board the Makai Train by making a contract with Gajari, eventually derailing and crashing the Madō Train, as well as cutting Sigma's hand off to break his spell, Sigma reveals a back-up plan: Using Zaruba to enter the True Demon World while having Kouga be absorbed into Gyanon to be Idea's core. While Sigma manage to successfully create Idea, he learns too late that his inner darkness had resurrected Gyannon as he finds himself sucked into the Horror's body. Though he escaped Gyannon's body prior to his destruction while losing his Horror powers, the ordeal placed Sigma on the verge of death as he decides to kill Kouga with the time he has left. Arriving to Saejima manor ahead of Kouga, Sigma holds Kaoru hostage while using his Makai Priest spells to erect an anti-Maki Armor barrier to uproot the structure into the air. After being mortally wounded, Sigma learns he was actually friends with Kouga while training as Makai Knights together and thought to have been devoured by the Horror Raizon. In his last breath, Sigma gives his Madō Brush to Leo before passing on.

While having the skills of both Makai Knights' swordsmanship and Makai Priests' magic, Sigma also utilizes the power of Horrors since his left arm's transformation upon touching Gyanon's flesh. He uses a deformed Madō Brush which can be transformed into a sword, as well as capable of donning the Jaaku (邪悪（ジャアク）) (Note: Jaaku (邪悪) is the Japanese word for "Evil".) armor, created from his Knight opponent's shadow only dissolves once his opponent removes his armor. He can also utilize Gōryūjin (号竜人) to fight for him.

Sigma Fudō is portrayed by Ozuno Nakamura, who also plays Leo, although his voice is deepened. As a child, he is portrayed by Tsukasa Taguchi (田口 司, Taguchi Tsukasa).

=== Gigi ===
Gigi (ギギ) is originally a human who Sigma murdered so he can use her corpse in his experiments to create a familiar to serve him. Gigi is modified by Sigma to be able to turn into moths, split into three Gigiru (ギギル) bodies, and utilize poisonous wing scales in her attacks from spraying it from her mouth to using her talons. Fighting Rekka and Jabi when they and Kaoru enter Gyanon to find Kouga, Gigi is incinerated by the Makai Priestesses' attack.

Gigi is portrayed by Hiromi Eguchi.

=== Judam ===
Judam (ジュダム, Judamu) is the main antagonist of Garo: Soukoku no Maryu, queen of the Green Castle. Like many of the residents of the Promised Land, Judam was an object created by humans yet discarded and forced to make a new life for herself. Feared by many in the Promised Land for her ability to read their names and erase it to reduce an object into nothingness, Judam despises those she considers ugly while having her forces gather the most beautiful objects in the realm to consume. Though she praises humans for their ability to create things of beauty, Judam admits she harbors a deep-seated grudge against them for discarding things without a second thought. Ultimately, her scheme was to become one with the legendary dragon Maryu so she can use its power to enter the human world and render all into nothingness. However, she meets her end at Kouga's hands while accepting his apology for humanity's actions against her.

Judam is portrayed by Keiko Matsuzaka (松坂 慶子, Matsuzaka Keiko).

=== Higari ===
Higari (翡刈) is the main antagonist of Garo Gaiden: Tougen no Fue. She is a fallen Makai Priestess who dabbled in the dark powers to the point that she was defeated by another Makai Priest named Sougen when he sacrificed himself to bind her soul within her skull. Eventually, Higari recruits two Makai Priestesses named Agi and Magi by offering them eternal life, as the latter is gravely ill, if they can find a Makai Priest who can see Sougen's skeletal arm as the Tougen Flute. From there, the person is subjected to repeat the eight note process that sealed Higari in order to reverse it. Rekka is revealed as the ideal host of the first seven notes representing the dark aspects of the human mind, but the final note is the death scream of a Makai Priest. Though Jabi was the intended target, Magi's desperate desire for life forced her to murder Agi when they two are backed into a corner. Once revived, Higari consumes everything nearby, including Magi and her lover's corpse, to create a demonic body for herself with the intent to kill Jabi and Rekka. However, the Makai Priestesses use the Scarlet Bird Flame Formation (緋鳥炎陣, Hichō Enjin) technique to destroy Higari.

Higari is portrayed by Hitomi Takahashi (高橋 ひとみ, Takahashi Hitomi).

=== Magi and Agi ===
Magi (麻妓) and Agi (阿妓) are Makai Priestesses who happen to be lovers, the former armed with dual bladed tonfas and the latter with a baton and axe. When Magi contracts a terminal illness, she and Agi formed a pact with Higari to revive her in return for eternal life even if it meant others have to die in the process. To that end, they search for a Makai Priest who can see the Tougen Flute as a flute instead of a skeletal arm. While Agi's attempt to use Jabi as the sacrificial candidate failed, Magi has better luck with Rekka and they use the deceived Makai Priestess to undo most of the seal. The final seal requires the dying scream of a Makai Priest to undo and with the plot to use Jabi for that purpose failed, Magi, now overwhelmed by her desire to live, murders Agi to fulfill their part of the bargain. However, instead of honoring her part of the deal, Higari ends up consuming Magi.

Magi is portrayed by Miku Oono (大野 未来, Ōno Miku) while Agi is portrayed by Kumi Takiuchi (瀧内 公美, Takiuchi Kumi).

=== Tousei Kaneshiro ===
Tousei Kaneshiro (金城 滔星, Kaneshiro Tōsei) is the principal antagonist of Garo: Yami o Terasu Mono. The estranged fourth son of Kensui Kaneshiro (金城 憲水, Kaneshiro Kensui; portrayed by Toshiyuki Kitami), Tousei was born from an exiled Makai Priestess who raised him to become a man of power. After learning of Zedom's existence from a chest in an abandoned house of his maternal family, Tousei deliberately brought an Inga gate to his home with the emerging Horror possessing his mother and devouring her guests before his eyes. Only able to escape death by the Inga gate's barrier, the event aroused Tousei and he desired to make use of the Horrors' power. This led to Tousei obtaining the Madō Horror Plants when he interfered in a ritual held by Hakana and her group, siring her protector Sonshi as his first Madō Horror. From there, Tousei captures and confines Hakana beneath the Hill of Zedom's Head to have her germinate Madō Horror Plants so he can sire more Madō Horrors while taking over Vol City from the shadows under the guise of the owner of a steakhouse. Among his victims was his brother Kaga Kaneshiro, rendering him mute before driving him off into the graveyard.

Upon learning of Ryuga's arrival in Vol City, Tousei develops an interest in the Makai Knight as he sires Enhou to become a Madō Horror while taking advantage of her curiosity in the recent chain of terrorist attacks. Tousei proceeds to befriend and Ryuga, misleading him into thinking his father is responsible for Vol City's predicament to get close enough as an ally to convert him into a Madō Horror. However, upon seeing the Garo armor's brilliance intensify, Tousei decides to let the Makai Knight be and use his lesser minions to speed up the armor's maturation while ending Hakana's singing to obtain the final Madō Horror Plant. Once his cover is unexpectedly blown by Kensui, Tousei decides to take full control of the Kaneshiro Group (金城グループ, Kaneshiro Gurūpu) by having Enhou and Rivera kill off his siblings and their families, with Ryuga's group serving as scapegoats in the 15 murders, so he would be the sole remaining heir before having Sonshi kill his father. When confronted by Ryuga's group, Tousei reveals his humanity and gloats that they are bound by their laws to not harm him as he guides them to the resting place of Zedom's head where he attempts to convert Ryuga due to the circumstances no longer being in his favor. Though his scheme to convert Ryuga with the final Madō Horror Plant fails, he has Rian captured and intends to obtain a new supply of Madō Horror Plants through her. But after poisoning Rian to force her to obtain Zedom's seeds from the seal at the Hill of Zedom's Head, Tousei's plot to use her is ruined by the unexpected arrival of Ryuga and Zedom starting to fully awaken. Fleeing after ordering to Enhou to get rid of Rian, Tousei is later livid after hearing about both her and Rivera's deaths prior to being forced to flee again from his lair when Zedom begins decimating the ruins.

Separated from Sonshi soon after he flees from his lair, Tousei stumbles upon a group of SG1 troopers transporting Hakana's body and decides to use them as sacrificial bodyguards so the Horrors now running rampant in the city would leave him be until daybreak. But Tousei fails to realize that his exceedingly overflowing darkness would have a stronger attraction as all the nearby Horrors chase after only him, thus ending up a vessel for countless Horrors after they corner him in a restroom. Going into hiding at his steakhouse to take advantage of Vol City's memory alteration, Tousei ends up being the only loose end by the time Ryuga finds him. Tousei attempts to flee but is caught by Rian at the door and is killed by the Makai Priestess while begging for his life.

Tousei Kaneshiro is portrayed by Kanji Tsuda. As a teenager, he is portrayed by Koudai Matsuoka (松岡 広大, Matsuoka Kōdai).

=== Enhou ===
Enhou (燕邦, Enhō) is the commander of the Kaneshiro Group's paramilitary force SG1 (Security Guardian 1), desiring to become strong since she was a child to protect people and preserve justice. She is sired unwittingly during a meet up with Tousei and remains oblivious to her status as a Madō Horror for a time, having dreams of feeding on men before coming to the realization of her turned nature when she devours her subordinate and boyfriend Yoshitomi (吉富; portrayed by Kazuki Fukuyama). On the surface, her personality remains the same as before she was sired, only warped with a desire to please her master. But in reality, some traces of Enhou's humanity remain and she secretly laments of her actions under Tousei's control. After being ultimately killed by Ryuga and Rian, Enhou dies with a smile on her face, with her body revealed to be still human. Using this to ensure that Enhou dies a hero instead of a monster, Rian disguises herself as the woman to expose Rivera in front of SG1 troops and makes it appear that Enhou is murdered by Rivera. Soon after, with her body taken by the SG1 for a proper funeral, Enhou's necklace ends up in Rian's possession.

Enhou is portrayed by Hiroko Sato (佐藤 寛子, Satō Hiroko)

=== Rivera ===
Rivera (リベラ, Ribera) is a two-faced Madō Horror who is armed with twin daggers that forms from her ears. Her role in running Vol City, believing justice is something you create rather than protect, is as Vol TV's newscaster who provides propaganda to hide Horror activity from the populace while promoting Vol City as a paradise. Having a taste for pretty women, Rivera devoured the lover of Yasuto Kazami a year earlier. In the present, working with Sonshi to label Ryuga a serial killer by tricking him into getting them the photographic evidence for manipulation, Rivera devours Kazami when he refuses to join their side. Rivera continues her anti-Ryuga campaign until she falls for the Makai Knight's trap to make it appear that she murdered him in cold blood on public television. As a result, with part of her tongue taken for a Madō Horror detection system, Rivera is forced to go into hiding and resurfaces later to aid Tousei while getting her revenge. However, though the confirmation of Ryuga still being alive and well clears her name, Rivera ends up still being called a murderer after being tricked into murdering who she thought was Enhou, while her identity as a Madō Horror is exposed in the process. With nothing else to lose and believing that Vol City's order is ruined, Rivera uses her connection to the Madō Horror Detector to locate the Makai Knights' base so she can capture Rian. However, her fight with the Makai Knights ends with her death at the hands of Ryuga.

Rivera is portrayed by Kumi Imura (井村 空美, Imura Kumi).

=== Sonshi ===
Sonshi (尊士) is a Madō Horror who was originally a Makai Knight assigned to oversee the ritual under the Hill of Zedom's Arm fifteen years prior in case of a Horror outbreak. However, due to Tousei's actions, Sonshi was stabbed with a Madō Horror Plant and became the first Madō Horror sired by him while forced to kill Sari and Rikyo before taking Hakana to Vol City. Under Tousei's orders, Sonshi plays the role of Kensui's attendant to keep the rich man in line while using him as a decoy to keep the Makai Knights from going after Tousei. Prior to formally introducing himself to the Makai Knights, Sonshi played a role in Rui Suzuki losing her family and later tricks Kazami to gather photographic evidence of Ryuga to make him a public enemy. Eventually, when the Makai Knights infiltrate the Kaneshiro Institute, Sonshi is driven off by Kensui who reveals Tousei's actions to Ryuga. Soon after, Sonshi assumes his position as Tousei's second in command prior to Zedom's resurrection. As Zedom begins breaking free from his seal, to render his master powerless, Sonshi is separated from Tousei by Burai so the Makai Knights can kill him without the human getting in the crossfire. Though he attempts to return to Tousei's side, Sonshi soon switch sides due to Zedom's influence and instead attempts to get Zedom one of the Makai Knights to offer as a vessel. However, after being cut down by Ryuga, Sonshi's lifeless body is spirited away by Zedom to serve the Horror as his new body.

As a former Makai Knight, Sonshi carries a Makai Sword with a white scabbard and wields it in reverse grip, although he wields a pair of sai almost exclusively as a Madō Horror, using his sword only when he is sufficiently cornered. Shown to be exceptionally powerful in both magic and martial arts, he is capable of taking on defeating all three knights stationed in Vol City simultaneously. Despite his prowess, Sonshi rarely sees action and usually serves as Tousei's right-hand man, bodyguard and scout, detaching his eye for surveillance purposes to enable Tousei to keep an eye on things, especially on Ryuga. Unlike most Madō Horrors, his true form is a corrupted version of his Makai Knight armor, capable of sprouting wings for flight and manifesting a sword and a pair of sai from his armor.

Sonshi is portrayed by Yasuaki Kurata (倉田 保昭, Yasuaki Kurata).

=== Iyu ===
Iyu (イユ) is the mother of Yuna who was originally a Makai Priestess. She desired a world free of Horrors so her daughter would not need to fight, and notably displeased that Kuroudo persisted with Yuna's training. Her notable ability is her singing voice that instills calmness in people and heal them of their physical wounds. Iyu taught Yuna the song when she was a child. Ten years prior to the events of Zero: Black Blood, Iyu was blinded by a Horror while protecting Yuna, before she was knocked over a bridge to what many assumed to be her death. In reality however, Iyu was saved by the Horror Ring as he deems her song touches him, and she joined his cause in what she believed to be an appealing co-existence between Horrors and humans. Being the only human who is deemed off-limits to the Horrors in Ring's community, Iyu plays a vital role in the community by using her singing voice to placate the emotions of the residential humans, especially those who are about to be served as Blood Dolces, and to ensure that Ring maintains his sense of self. However, placing her daughter's well-being before her own when both mother and daughter reunite, Iyu stops singing for Ring in an arranged act of redemption in her role in the Horror's plans, by having him revert to his true nature and devour her.

Iyu is portrayed by Karia Nomoto (野本 かりあ, Nomoto Karia).

=== Eiji Busujima ===
Eiji Busujima (毒島 エイジ, Busujima Eiji), also known by the title Giru the Heretic Bone Knight (邪骨騎士・義流（ギル）, Jakotsu Kishi Giru), (Note: The kanji that make up the name "Giru" (義流) are literally translated as "Flow of Justice".) is a Makai Knight who once served the Senate and was the leader of the Shadowfolk Makai Knights. Busujima was once an honorable and upright person, whose teachings and code of conduct stressing prioritization of missions as Makai Knights above everything else; Crow, as a former student, holds these teachings with the utmost respect and continues to adhere to them to this day. Busujima eventually learned of Eyrith and the rumor of the Horror's power of resurrection when his beloved Akari was dying. This drove Busujima into madness as he attempted to use Mayuri as a receptacle for his lover's soul, before setting out to find the Ady Slate. Believing that he succeeded in sealing Akari's soul when she died, he proceeded to unravel the seal on the Ady Slate, so as to resurrect Akari no matter the cost. After capturing Mayuri and giving Eyrith a sample of Akari's DNA, Busujima confronts Raiga and Crow when they attempt to stop him. However, he realized the error of his ways when being berated by Raiga, who had met Akari as a child, and seeing Crow ended up as Eyrith's host; he attempted to help Raiga as redemption before Eyrith wounds him. Busujima then learn from Mayuri that his plan of transferring Akari's soul never succeeded, as Mayuri was never capable of sealing a human's soul, but is given some closure as he is left in Bikuu's care. The reformed Busujima joins forces to help Crow stop Raiga when he is possessed by his armor, until the Golden Knight manages to take back control of his body and departs to defeat Eyrith. He is last seen putting up a grave marker for Akari.

In Garo: Makai Retsuden, it is revealed that he is imprisoned by the Makai Order for his crimes. Crow visited Eiji one day, asking for a duel to the death in the mental realm in order to face up to his weakness. Eiji ended up defeated, revealing that it was just a ruse so that Crow could help cut down his former mentor's inner darkness. Surprised at how much his former pupil had grown, both vowed to fight alongside each other in the future when he is released.

Befitting his status as the former leader of the Shadowfolk Makai Knights, he is a formidable fighter who would not have been sufficiently taken down by the combined efforts of both Crow and Raiga, had he not wavered during the fight. Despite being a Makai Knight, Busujima is also shown to be knowledgeable in magic as he uses various spirit tags to distract, bind and attack his opponents, and wears a pair of gloves which allow him to conjure concussive fire blasts and catch Soul Metal blades unscathed. He wields a chokuto like the rest of the Shadowfolk Makai Knights and dons a bronze-colored armor armed with the Jakotsuken (邪骨剣; Heretic Bone Sword).

Eiji Busujima is portrayed by Show Aikawa (哀川 翔, Aikawa Shō).

=== Agō ===
Agō (阿号) is the main antagonist of the film Garo: Goldstorm Sho. Agō is a humanoid Madōgu created by Sōtatsu ages ago, able to assume an armored form that is armed with the Gōsatsuken (号殺剣; Gō Killing Sword) and has the ability to fly. Believing that humans and darkness are intertwined, Agō steals the severed arm of the Horror Degol from its resting place to achieve his goal to create a world without Horrors by wiping out all of humanity. After he was defeated by Ryuga, only a fragment of Agō remained that D Ringo used to help him protect the city from Radan's missiles.

Agō is portrayed by Shunya Isaka (井坂 俊哉, Isaka Shunya).

=== Zesshin ===
Zesshin (絶心) is the main antagonist of Bikuu. He is a fallen Makai Priest who was originally a Darkness Slasher who created the magic that allows the user to enter a human's mind, a spell now commonly used by all Darkness Slashers. Zesshin possesses an alaya-vijnana mark, a rare crescent-shaped birthmark on the back of his right hand, that is known to be a good luck charm and a sign of great potential. Imprisoned and near death, he uses a modified version of the mind entry spell to escape confinement and possess body after body, intending to eventually merge his corrupt soul with the entire world, which he finds beautifully chaotic. His family frequently engaged in incest to keep their powerful bloodline "pure," and Zesshin himself fathered Saya via another of his daughters.

Zesshin is portrayed by Shirō Sano (佐野 史郎, Sano Shirō).

=== Saya ===
Saya (紗夜) is a Makai Priestess who keeps watch on Byakkai by order of the Senate. It is later revealed that she is one of Zesshin's daughters, a product of father-daughter incest, and intends to continue the practice once her father possesses a compatible body. She thought herself conspiring with her father to realize his ambition, and that she was using Byakkai for information, not knowing that she was the one being manipulated by both men for their respective goals instead. She is defeated by Bikuu and imprisoned, last seen in a catatonic state. It is implied that Byakkai possesses her body after his death.

Saya is portrayed by Erika Asakura (朝倉 えりか, Asakura Erika).

=== Byakkai ===
Byakkai (白海) is a Makai Priest and Bikuu's mentor who was originally a Darkness Slasher. He is confined in a luxurious penthouse-like cell for quitting being a Darkness Slasher without permission, as well as having knowledge of secrets the Senate does not want anyone else knowing. He equates the cell to a coffin, despite having any luxuries he could ask for under such circumstances. Bikuu goes to him for information and advice at the start of the Zesshin incident, and he tells her everything there is to know about the subject at hand, then passes onto her a powerful spell said to be formidable enough to take down Zesshin, which however, proved to be ineffective later. He is set free after the incident is resolved, showing the Senate that Darkness Slashers can indeed be trusted through Bikuu's work in taking down Zesshin. However it was later revealed to and by Bikuu, that he orchestrated the entire Zesshin incident to send a message to the Senate, that being a Darkness Slasher was a bitter profession and that they should be sympathized, not feared nor scorned. He subsequently taunts Bikuu fondly of her inability to kill him, as his orb is still white from not having actually dirtied his hands despite being the one behind the sinister plot. He is implied to have possessed Saya's body after Bikuu did end up executing her former master regardless.

Byakkai is portrayed by Mickey Curtis (ミッキー・カーチス, Mikkī Kāchisu).

=== Erika ===
Erika (エリカ) is a Makai Priestess who is ordered by her handler to assassinate Bikuu.

Erika is portrayed by Misaki Momose (桃瀬 美咲, Momose Misaki).

=== Edel ===
Edel (エデル, Ederu) is the main antagonist of Zero: Dragon Blood, a Dragon Knight. He is awakened from thousands of years of sleep by Makai Priest Okina and aimed at getting his hands on the Dragon Egg. He is able to assume an armored form called Armored Dragon Edel (鎧竜エデル, Gairyū Ederu) by removing an evil qi-tainted dragon fang from his necklace and stabbing it into his arm. His armored form, despite appearing to be more powerful than a Makai Knight's armor, has the side effect of incapacitating him for a certain period of time afterwards, and requiring him to force said fang out from his body in a rather painful manner. He possesses the ability to command dragons regardless of their prior allegiance, able to turn back Rekka's summoned young Demon World Dragons with a word, and create dragon familiars out of various kinds of scraps called Giryū (義竜) to serve him. He can also set his blade aflame by scraping it across his forearm. In his unarmored state, he is able to use a stinger-like tail that can extend from his upper back.

Edel hailed from a time long before the emergence of Makai Priests, where humanity had yet to discover ways to fight Horrors effectively. He was made a sacrifice as an infant by the humans of his village to appease the Horrors, but was rescued by a dragon before he was devoured by said Horrors. The dragon raised him as her own, naming him "Edel", which meant "the land" in dragon language, and taught him everything he knew, including ways of slaying Horrors. Eventually, the dragon passed on during his teenage years, her remains formed into a shrine of woody substance and left an egg behind. The egg hatched sometime later and Edel, in turn, raised the infant dragon as his own, naming her "Nova" (ノヴァ), which meant "the waters" in dragon language. As with Nova's "mother", both became inseparable as Edel grown into a young man and Nova grew into her adult form, spending their days together slaying Horrors, so much so that Edel had later taken Nova to be his "wife". The duo happened to save a human village one day from the Horrors, and finding it rather enjoyable saving lives, they somehow became heroes in their own right protecting humans from Horrors. Despite having fought Horrors and protecting humanity faithfully, a group of Makai Priests saw him as an abomination who was neither dragon nor human, and Nova a monster whose powers to be harnessed. This group abducted Nova when she was at her weakest—having after laid an egg not long ago, and set up a ritual to harness her powers. Edel eventually came to her rescue, but Nova was killed nonetheless trying to save him, slaying the group of Makai Priests and putting Edel in his suspended animation state in the process.

Since then, he turned to be disgusted by humanity instead, with his first act upon awakening being to kill Okina, after being told to harness the dragon's powers to slay Horrors, as it reminded him of the nightmare long ago. Despite being a human, he claims to relate with the dragons better and sees himself as a dragon in human form. He sees humanity as nothing more than ugly, filthy vermin to be cleansed from the face of the Earth, and intends to do so once he gets his hands on the Dragon Egg. He is defeated by the combined forces of Rei, Rekka, and Kagome, being thrown into a chasm after Kagome sacrifices herself to defeat him. However, he is soon revived by the sacrifice of his mechanical fish-like familiar Ruru (ルルウ, Rurū), and resumes his hunt for the Dragon Egg.

Giryū have the forms of a small dragon-like Gen (元), an iron maiden-like Shō (鍾), a crow-like Karasu (鴉), and a horse-like Gan (巌). A number of Gen and a Karasu can combine into a humanoid Giryūjin (義竜人).

Edel is portrayed by Tomohisa Yuge (弓削 智久, Yuge Tomohisa).

=== Banbi ===
Banbi (蛮美) is a Makai Priestess and Aguri's childhood friend, who wears a mask to hide her burned face. She meets Aguri again at some point prior to the events of Garo: Kami no Kiba, and asks him to lend her his armor for one night as a means of resurrecting Judo (ジュドー, Judō), a fallen Makai Knight and her lover temporarily. Despite the deed not being a good idea, Aguri relented due to his relationship with her. However, she immediately goes about stealing other Makai Knight armors when she finds out that one set of armor is inadequate of completing the ritual. Banbi took to working with Rinza, a Horror who claimed that she would help Banbi gather the necessary amount of armors, especially that of Garo's, and fend off would-be pursuers, in exchange for being allowed to devour the presumably the owner of the title of Garo, claiming that it would make them immortal. However, that is revealed to be a lie and Rinza had been using Banbi all along, cooperating so as to use the resurrected fallen Makai Knight as a tool to create and activate the Fang of God. Banbi is crestfallen once the ploy is revealed to her and the fallen Knight she resurrected is revealed to be Jinga instead of Judo, whom Rinza deems to be too weak for his intended purpose. As Jinga spirits the now heartbroken Banbi away, who dies shortly after, she is temporarily resurrected in the likeness of Amily, a woman an amnesiac Jinga claims to somehow "feel close to him", and used as a mindless doll to hold Rian off. She is finally put to rest by Rian after being defeated.

Banbi is portrayed by Hiroko Yashiki (屋敷 紘子, Yashiki Hiroko).

=== Shōsetsu Hagiri ===
Shōsetsu Hagiri (葉霧 宵刹, Hagiri Shōsetsu) is the main antagonist of Garo: Versus Road. 20 years ago, he was one of the 100 Makai Knights-to-be that Shidōin chose to find the most suitable person to be a new holder of the title of Garo. He is the one who created virtual reality headsets, and watches the players of the virtual reality death game "Garo: Versus Road" through monitors in the ruins of Shidōin. He seeks to fill the Garo armor with the players' inner darkness to create Veil (ベイル, Beiru), a black Dark Metal armor armed with a sword that can be turned into a whip sword. After the end of the game, the Veil armor is born and he dons it and fights Kuon donning the Garo armor. However, he ends up being defeated by Kuon and killed by Azami.

Shōsetsu Hagiri is portrayed by Tomomi Maruyama (丸山 智己, Maruyama Tomomi). As a youth, he is portrayed by Kyoya Honda (本田 響矢, Honda Kyōya).

=== Azami Kadō ===
Azami Kadō (伽堂 アザミ, Kadō Azami) is Hagiri's collaborator who chose 100 men for the game "Garo: Versus Road". After Hagiri's defeat by Kuon, she kills the collaborator that is not useful anymore, and leaves for parts unknown.

The gifted Makai Priestess of Shidōin, Azami Kadō is the daughter of the last Golden Knight Garo who gave his life to save the human realm from the latest of once every 500 years of cataclysm that threaten humanity. Her late mother was a Makai Priestess who not only the husband of the same Golden Knight, but also his partner and apparently came from the different branch of Makai Order (as she wield Madō Brush unlike those in Shidōin). Azami's mother died shortly after giving birth to her, leading Priestess Kadō taking care of her in her stead. Azami grew into a talented Makai Priestess noted for being the only one who can control the darkness, and Shidōin sought to use her dark gift for its own purpose. Little did the Order knew that the reason why Azami possessed such gift was because of her ensouled by the very fragment of darkness her father destroyed long ago, and now aimed to continue what it started. For the same reason, her heart is filled with dark and sadistic thoughts in addition of devoid of humanity her birth parents possess, something that became apparent when she interfered the final round of the Shidōin's brutal succession ceremony to determine the heir of Garo armor and introduced its surviving contestant, Hagiri, the might of Dark Metal to recruited him into his cause until he outlived her usefulness. Azami is also not above dirtying her hands in ensuring things go into her favor as shown through possessing Taisuke Nagumo to force him participate in the final round of Versus Road death game when the latter knew too much about conspiracy behind it.

After Hagiri's defeat, Azami executed him as he had outlived his usefulness and takes away Dark Metal Veil armor composed of, but choose not to kill the victorious Sena Kuon, the new Golden Knight, and left for parts unknown, but nevertheless promised that they will meet again someday.

Azami Kadō is portrayed by Kyoko Hinami (日南 響子, Hinami Kyōko). As a teenager, she is portrayed by Rin Marumoto (丸本 凛, Marumoto Rin).

=== Shuka ===
Shuka (朱伽) is a humanoid Madōgu who serves as the navigator of the game "Garo: Versus Road". Later, she possesses self-awareness and says that it's wrong to kill each other to choose the successor of the title of Garo. Due to this, she is slain by Hagiri.

Shuka is portrayed by Nashiko Momotsuki (桃月 なしこ, Momotsuki Nashiko).

=== Mutsugi ===
Mutsugi (ムツギ) is a Makai Priestess in charge of Creacity and Koyori's mentor. She was once Godou Shirahane's partner and friend. Three years prior to the events of Garo: Hagane o Tsugu Mono, Mutsugi grew jaded and obsessed with cleansing the world of negative karma when a man she saved from a Horror later became a murderer. To that end, she sought a mythological forbidden fruit that would grant anyone who possessed it omniscience and omnipotence, wanting to use its power to kill all evil people in the world. She eventually discovered a text that suggested that the forbidden fruit was hidden within the Gate of Destruction and turned against Godou, who wanted to prevent the gate from opening. Three years later, she manipulates the Creacity team, particularly Godou's son Souma, into traveling to the Gate of Destruction to break the seal on Lost Soul Beast Zango and open the Gate. When the Gate opens, she consumes the forbidden fruit, which grants her overwhelming power, but she is eventually defeated when Koyori transforms her Madō Brush into a spear of light embued with her feelings, which is thrown by an armored Ryuga. She is quickly possessed by the Seducer and transformed into a Horror, which is defeated by Ryuga's Dark Flash Sword Dance. After the Gate of Destruction is resealed, her freed human spirit is seen acknowledging the group.

Mutsugi is portrayed by Tomoka Kurotani (黒谷 友香, Kurotani Tomoka).

=== Seducer ===
The Seducer is the main antagonist of Garo: Hagane o Tsugu Mono. She is a mysterious entity with the appearance of a red-haired woman in a red dress who dwells in a mythological forbidden fruit and turns people in Creacity into Horrors' hosts. Her goal is to open Gate of Destruction to plunge the human world into chaos once again. She possesses Mutsugi to forcefully turn her into a Horror, only to be defeated by Ryuga.

The Seducer is portrayed by Sara Oshino (おしの 沙羅, Oshino Sara).

== Makai entities ==
=== Old Lady Tamu ===
Old Lady Tamu (タム婆, Tamu-baa) is a living Makai gateway. Though humanoid, various parts of her body is composed of wood and branches. Between her "thighs" is the entrance to the Crimson Forest (紅蓮の森, Guren no Mori). Without permission from Tamu, no one can enter. She had a friendly relationship with Makai Priest Amon and enjoys sharing a cup of red sake with him.

Tamu is portrayed by Toshie Negishi (根岸 季衣, Negishi Toshie).

=== Grau Dragon ===
The Grau Dragon (グラウ竜, Gurau-ryū) is the guardian of the Varrancas Fruit (ヴァランカスの実, Varakasu no Mi) which it produces within its body. The Grau Dragon is a sentient mechanical dragon created to reside inside the Crimson Forest and hunt the Horrors there. He has a main dragon head on the top and four sides to his body (almost cube-like). His cube-like body has a rustic color and when he speaks he rotates it to a different side of his body. Whenever he reacts to some thought his body makes a turn. Two sides of his body have a white naked woman statue, the front side a white gothic skull of a creature, and the back side with just gears that resemble the yin/yang sign. The Grau Dragon has a blaster-cannon, his statues are actually large mechanical claws, his gothic skull is actually a claw and grinder, and his gear side has multiple mechanical tentacles. He has four mechanical legs and his back is capable of bringing out two large wings for flight. His only purpose is to destroy Horrors, the Grau Dragon's fangs are used by Makai Knights to hone their skills.

When the Grau Dragon first encountered Kouga when he needs the Varrancas Fruit to save Kaoru, he expresses being curious about the Makai Knight's nature to protect people and challenged Kouga to defeat him with all his strength to win the fruit. The Grau Dragon helped Kouga summon his armor and Gōten to fight at his full potential while engaging in a clash of ideals if saving lives is more important than destroying Horrors. Kouga almost lost to him, but Rei stepped in to assist him. Kouga thought he lost the fight because he had help, but the Grau Dragon said that if Rei lend his power to Kouga, then that's also part of his power. Though the Grau Dragon vanished, Silva remarked that the Grau Dragon was never alive and that the power of the Demon World will eventually recreate it. By the events of Garo: Makai Senki, the Grau Dragon becomes active again.

The Grau Dragon is voiced by Masakazu Handa (半田 雅和, Handa Masakazu).

=== Makai Tree ===
The Makai Tree (魔戒樹, Makaiju) are tree-like creatures that reside in the Makai Forest (魔戒の森, Makai no Mori), products of the Horror Eyrith. One such Makai Tree kept Jabi within her stomach, which resembles as a round squid-like creature with multiple eyes. She has many tentacles and can shoot spears out of her "body" to defend herself. She's not a malicious creature; she kept Jabi sleeping inside her stomach for a 200-year incubation. She claimed that Jabi wasn't ready to reincarnate (hinting the Makai Tree had plans for Jabi) when Kouga came to save her.

Kouga at first had to fight off the Makai Tree's illusionary attacks. The Makai Tree has the ability to take on the forms of people within the memories of Kouga. For Kouga it as easy when Barago, Kodama, and Rei appeared, but the most difficult was when Kaoru and Taiga's form was taken. Eventually Kouga learned to suppress his feelings just long enough to defeat the Makai Tree on the first round. During the second round Kouga had Gōten increase the Garou Zanbaken twice its size and surfed the sword into the Makai Tree's stomach. The Makai Tree's stomach exploded and Jabi was saved. Jabi was spirited back to the living. The Makai Tree was only defeated, not destroyed.

The Makai Tree is voiced by Yukari Okuda (奥田 ゆかり, Okuda Yukari).

=== Young Demon World Dragons ===
Young Demon World Dragons (魔界竜の稚魚, Makairyū no Chigyo) are small draconic fishes tamed and deployed by Makai Order as familiars for variety of purposes such as sensory detection, scouting, combat, and messaging. Usually summoner in swarms by Makai Priests, the creatures can either tearing target apart with their teeth like piranhas or detonate in rapid, destructive kamikaze attack; able to stay with its master/summoner for extended amount of time, or vaporizing back into the Demon World realm to avoid death.

=== Spirit Beast ===
The Spirit Beast (霊獣, Reijū) is a mysterious creature whose pelt is used as a material for making hairs of Madō Brushes, while it itself is the only creature that can restore a brush's fading power, though hunting down the Spirit Beast without permission is strictly forbidden. The Spirit Beast can usually only be seen by extremely rare chance, and perception of its appearance differ from one person to another. Those who seek the Spirit Beast intentionally must possess a ceremonial blade and travel through a certain path in a certain manner, and remain untainted by evil qi along the way. The Spirit Beast exists in a different plane of existence, as such, a final ritual of synchronizing one's space-time with that of the Spirit Beast's is needed. Although the Spirit Beast is harmless, it is however, accompanied by a ferocious guardian beast called Origs (オリグス, Origusu), which attacks indiscriminately anyone who intentionally gets near the Spirit Beast. To those capable of painting, there is also a custom of gifting a painting of the Spirit Beast as he or she perceives it, to the person one cherishes the most. Regardless of its appearance when fully grown, it appears as a sentient fur ball as a baby.

=== Zaji ===
Zaji (ザジ) (Note: In the ending credits, it has a subtitle of Spacetime Horror (時空ホラー, Jikū Horā).) is a manifestation created from the essence of many Horrors who were slain by the Makai Knights bearing the title of Garo; his appearance differs depending on the person inheriting the title. Because of his origins, driven by the Horror essence that composes his being, Zaji exists with the sole purpose to kill Golden Knights with extreme prejudice. Among his abilities is manipulation of time and space, using it to create a clone of himself and change the flow of time as well as the battlefield. Using a broken stone face from a sphinx-based Horror statue to gain physical form, Zaji challenges Kouga to a fight to the death. Once his identity is revealed during the fight by the will of the ancestors of Kouga taking form of the Golden Knight, Garo damages the statue's restored face to destroy the Horror gate that enables Zaji to exist. Though defeated, Zaji points out that his kind will kill Kouga and his successors in time, and that Kouga shall not have peace until his death should he choose to walk the path of a Makai Knight.

Zaji appears once more in Garo: Makai no Hana, this time to face off against Kouga's son Raiga who has gone for purification while getting a new Grau Dragon's fang. As Raiga has killed his hundredth Horror, the fang became embedded in the nearby broken statue face holding the sealed Zaji, and the Horror latches himself to it. Once the fang is installed in the Saejima manor, Zaji proceeds to make attempts to kill Raiga at his home with two clones. Once personally facing Raiga, Zaji overwhelms the Makai Knight by revealing his ability to transform into Super Zaji (超ザジ, Chō Zaji), a large demonic version of himself. However, Zaji ends up being defeated by Raiga once again, right after he acquires the right to summon Gōten, which he earns due to the will of Garo reasoning that by fighting Zaji, he would be in fact fighting himself. Zaji curses the current Garo before exploding upon his defeat. But Zaji is revived once more by Eyrith, who offers him the chance to wipe out the Garo line by sending him a time-displaced Rekka and Rian who the being sensed to be tied the Garo line. Luckily, the women were saved from certain death by Kouga who was also displaced from the realm he ended up in after Eyrith removed him and Kaoru from their time.

Zaji is voiced by Hiroyuki Amano (天野 ひろゆき, Amano Hiroyuki).

=== Gajari ===
Gajari (ガジャリ) is a being within the Senate's walls that was created long ago by the Makai Knights' collective imagination as a protector of humanity. While more of a neutral being, seeing no distinction between humans and Horrors, Gajari only aids the Makai Knights due to a pact said to last for centuries. It is said that forming a pact with Gajari has consequences even if the reasons are pure, with Kouga making such a pact to stop Sigma and is forced by the deal to travel to the Promised Land to retrieve a part of Gajari's body: the Fang of Lamentation. However, Kouga learns that his quest was a means for him to understand the relationship between the Makai Knights and Gajari.

Gajari is voiced by Ryūzaburō Ōtomo (大友 龍三郎, Ōtomo Ryūzaburō).

=== Barg ===
Barg (バルグ, Barugu) is a beast with several swords embedded in its back, which is capable of sealing Horrors inside its own body. Barg is used by the Shadowfolk Makai Knights as a means of purifying their blades. It is usually sealed in a deep well in a small shrine guarded by the Shadowfolk Knights and lays dormant. However, it can awaken from the slightest of physical disturbance, evident from being awakened when a young Knight peered into the well out of curiosity and a drop of his sweat landed onto Barg. It has a violent temperament and is powerful enough to kill Makai Knights, as well as sprout wings for flight. While it resents being sealed in the shrine and used as a tool, it cannot survive for long outside the shrine and will die in less than a day going outside.

When Barg escaped, Gento, Crow, and Raiga deem it necessary to slay Barg, despite the fact that it has less than a day to live, due to it having killed four Makai Knights. Slaying Barg proves to be troublesome as it cannot be simply cut down, due to Horrors sealed within would be released if Barg dies. Gento and Crow, the two remaining Shadowfolk Makai Knights present when it escaped, have to trap it under a temporary moonlight barrier before Raiga can move in to cut it down, so as to contain the Horrors sealed within it.

Mayuri easily empathizes with Barg, due to her being a Madōgu as well, and attempts to seal it within her at the risk of her own life. She is visibly saddened when it is cut down, and proceeds to put up a grave marker using one of the swords from its back.

=== Dragons ===
Dragons are entities originating from the Demon World and little is known about them, as only one was known to have been around in ancient times and no sightings of these creatures have been documented since the only dragon known died. According to Edel, dragons are very intelligent beings, evident from one capable of raising Edel himself from infancy and teaching him everything he knew about the world, including ways of slaying Horrors, which was virtually unknown at the time. The dragons also have their own language, with examples of "Edel" meaning "the lands" and "Nova" meaning "the waters". While capable of eating food from the human realm and even finding such food to be enjoyable, dragons sustain themselves solely through consumption of evil qi. They breed slowly, as seen in Nova's case where creating and laying an egg itself takes considerable time and effort, and severely weakens them for a period of time. They could also leave behind an egg when they pass, as seen in the case of Edel's first partner. As their name suggest, they are fearsome creatures of formidable power, with the example of an infant hatched not long ago sporting powers comparable to that of a Makai Priest with advanced combat magic, and teleporting elsewhere after using such powers.

Dragons are also emotional beings and are known to form deep attachments to those who are close to them. It is in their instinct to put their lives on the line without hesitation for the sake of their loved ones, even at infancy. Unlike most creatures hailing from the Demon World realm, they are not inherently hostile to humans, and one lone example have been shown to be fond of humans enough to save an infant sacrifice from Horrors and raising the baby as her own.

=== Rauru ===
Rauru (ラウル) is the spirit of the One-Eyed Forest (隻眼の森, Sekigan no Mori), where the Stone of Eternal Darkness (常闇の石, Tokoyami no Ishi) that serves as the key to the Arivis (アリビス, Aribisu) labyrinth lies. The path to the forest is opened on the Night of the Red Moondawn (朱月の夜, Akatsuki no Yoru), which occurs once every three years.

Rauru is voiced by Kenichi Suzumura (鈴村 健一, Suzumura Ken'ichi).

=== Sacred Beasts ===
Sacred Beasts (聖獣, Seijū) are creatures that serve as protectors of the human world. Seiryu (青龍, Seiryū), Byakko (白虎), Suzaku (朱雀), and Genbu (玄武) have the respective powers of earth, wind, fire, and water, and were known as the Four Gods (四神, Shishin) in ancient times. Kirin (麒麟) is the presence that unites the four Sacred Beasts. The four Sacred Beasts' souls reside in wooden tags embedded in the compass, while Kirin's soul resides within Makai Guide Fuki. Byakko sometimes leaves the compass to assume a human form and enjoy the human world.

Byakko is portrayed by Kazuki Namioka (波岡 一喜, Namioka Kazuki). Seiryu, Suzaku, and Genbu are voiced by Hiroki Yasumoto (安元 洋貴, Yasumoto Hiroki), Kazato Tomizawa (冨沢 風斗, Tomizawa Kazato), and Mari Hino (日野 まり, Hino Mari).

== Players of Garo: Versus Road ==
=== Ryōsuke Amō ===
Ryōsuke Amō (天羽 涼介, Amō Ryōsuke) is the owner of the bar Meteor. His strength in fights is known to local underworld figures. He has a pet dog named Kotera (コテラ). His weapons of choice within the game are two metal gauntlets. In the final round of the death game, he is defeated by Kuon, who refuses to finish him off, before being killed by Hagiri.

Ryōsuke Amō is portrayed by Yuhi (勇翔, Yūhi).

=== Taisuke Nagumo ===
Taisuke Nagumo (南雲 太輔, Nagumo Taisuke) is a video creator who runs his Y-Tube channel, Nag Station. He has the ability to collect information efficiently and also has photographic memory. His weapon of choice within the game is an expandable baton. After the fourth round of the death game, his investigation into the game leads to him being possessed by Azami. In the final round of the death game, he manages to be freed from her control and tries to kill her. However, he gets fatally wounded by her before telling Kuon the truth of the game and dying in his arms.

Taisuke Nagumo is portrayed by Tokito (時人).

=== Takane Kōzuki ===
Takane Kōzuki (香月 貴音, Kōzuki Takane) is a clothing sales assistant and fashion magazine model with an androgynous appearance. He always carries a stuffed bunny that he made during his junior high school days, and it means a lot to him. 8 years ago, when he was in junior high school, he killed his two classmates bullying him and his teacher turning a blind eye to bullying. After his release from medical juvenile training school, he changed his name legally from Takeshi Noda (野田 武志, Noda Takeshi). His weapon of choice within the game is a ballistic knife. In the final round of the death game, he is beaten to death by Amō.

Takane Kōzuki is portrayed by Toman (とまん). As a teenager, he is portrayed by Mahiro Fukada (深田 真弘, Fukada Mahiro).

=== Shōri Hoshiai ===
Shōri Hoshiai (星合 翔李, Hoshiai Shōri) is Kuon's childhood friend from elementary school who goes the same university as him. He doesn't have any goals for the future and often cuts classes to spend a lot of his time at amusement arcades. His weapon of choice within the game is a silver longsword with a blue gem in the hilt, based on a keychain he owned as a child that served as a symbol of his friendship with Kuon. In the third round of the death game, he is possessed by a Horror and asks Kuon to kill him. While the friend is hesitating, he detonates his explosive collar to kill himself before fully becoming a Horror.

Shōri Hoshiai is portrayed by Naoya Shimizu (清水 尚弥, Shimizu Naoya). As a child, he is portrayed by Niko Tomonaga (朝長 ニコ, Tomonaga Niko).

=== Dai Kanata ===
Dai Kanata (奏風 大, Kanata Dai) is a quasi-gang leader who is Amō's rival from junior high school. His ambition is to be the top underworld figure. His weapon of choice within the game is a metal baseball bat. In the fourth round of the death game, he uses the demon sword against Hyūga but fails to slay the foe within its time limit. As a result, he becomes an undead before ending up being slain by Amō using the demon sword.

Dai Kanata is portrayed by Shutaro Kadoshita (門下 秀太郎, Kadoshita Shūtarō).

=== Ren Hyūga ===
Ren Hyūga (日向 蓮, Hyūga Ren) is a 21-year-old serial killer who escaped from a transport vehicle. He has great physical abilities. His weapons of choice within the game are two karambit. In the fourth round of the death game, he uses the demon sword against an undead Kanata but fails to slay the foe within its time limit. As a result, he becomes an undead before ending up being slain by Kuon using the demon sword.

Ren Hyūga is portrayed by Reiji.
