= List of Garo: Makai Senki episodes =

This is a list of episodes of the 2011-2012 Japanese tokusatsu television series Garo: Makai Senki, the sequel to 2005 and 2006's Garo.

== Episodes ==
No.	Title	Written by	Original release date
1	"Spark"; Transliteration: "Hibana" (Japanese: 火花)	Itaru Era; Keita Amemiya	October 6, 2011
After being promoted to the personal Makai Knight of the Senate for his vanquishing of the Apostle Horrors, Kouga Saejima is assigned the task to slay the Horror Cigarein. However, after destroying the Horror, Kouga is attacked by a mysterious figure in a red mask. Momentarily shrugging off the attack, Kouga returns to Saejima Estate where his butler Gonza Kurahashi greets him and tells him that Kaoru Mitsuki was there waiting for him. Retiring to his study, Kouga finds out that the masked man had marked him with the Seal of Destruction, giving him little time to live.
2	"Street Light"; Transliteration: "Gaitō" (Japanese: 街灯)	Itaru Era	October 13, 2011
Arriving at the Senate, its leader Grace introduces Kouga to his new partner, the genius Makai Priest Leo Fudō, before giving him his new mission to find and destroy the Horror Luzagin. Arriving to the park where history of unsavory executions turned into an ideal place for a Horror gate, Kouga deduces Luzagin's actions in devouring one man while spiriting off with the other. Using the young Makai Dragon (which is visually similar to a goldfish & named after Kaoru) that Rekka gave him, Kouga arrives to Luzagin's lair. There, he finds Kaoru, who ended up there when she followed the light of the horrors lampost styled gate, and he instructs her to escape before the fight begins. After fatally wounding Luzagin, Kouga makes up lost time with Kaoru as she shows him a public wall painting she did if her father's version of Garo. She proudly tells him the painting has given her the chance to make her own picture book. Though he hides the Seal of Destruction from Kaoru, Kouga promises to be the first to read her new book.
3	"Wheels"; Transliteration: "Sharin" (Japanese: 車輪)	Kei Taguchi; Makoto Yokoyama	October 20, 2011
Kouga and a young Makai Priest named Leo Fudō are assigned to deliver a new Makai tool, the Gōryū named Colt to the Western district Makai Priest. While en route to their destination, the two arrive at the lair of the Horror Melgis. Leo asks the Makai Knight to let him and his Gōryū Colt handle the monster. Though wounded, Leo manages to destroy the monster, but Kouga's car is damaged in the process. Later, as Leo tends to his wounds, he and Kouga proceed to talk about whether Makai Priests should become more active in dealing with Horrors. The next day, the case holding Colt is nowhere to be seen. While searching for the case, Colt appears from nowhere to attack Kouga. Colt rejects Leo's orders as it combines with a motorcycle and drives off, much to the young Makai Priest's shock. It is revealed that Leo's blood dripped into Colt and caused it to develop Horror-like instincts which make it a threat. Though Leo is certain Kouga intends to destroy the Gōryū, Kouga shows heart and says he wishes to salvage the weapon. As Kouga races after Colt, he guides it towards Leo, who is able to seal Colt's Horror impulses for the time they need to force a confrontation. Leo manages to create another seal to form a district-wide barrier of sunlight (even though it has already turned night) to keep Colt from escaping and reaching its full power. But when even Garo cannot stop the berserk Gōryū on Gōten, Leo covers himself in self-destruct talismans with the intent of using a suicide attack to destroy Colt. However, Garo manages to get between the two and stabs Colt, exorcizing the Horror influence from the Gōryū. After Kouga tells Leo to trust him in the future, they receive a visit from Rei Suzumura, the western Makai Knight, who reveals to Kouga (and a shocked Leo) that he has also been marked with the Seal of Destruction.
4	"Joker"; Transliteration: "Kirifuda" (Japanese: 切札)	Toshiki Inoue	October 27, 2011
After turning down an offer to play against Kaoru and Gonza in a card game, Kouga receives orders to go after a gambling Horror who lures his victims into a deadly game of poker. Posing as a gambler named Mr. Black Jaguar, and after receiving a few poker lessons from Zaruba, Kouga enters the poker game as two of the gamblers, the overconfident Big Mamma and the cheating Miss Ririka, are sucked into another dimension upon losing. Eventually, upon allowing himself to lose, Kouga ends up in the Horror's domain to discover which of the two remaining players is the Horror. Though the player Kid loses his next hand, he reveals himself to be the Horror's host, stating that he faked his loss so as to sample the soul of the winner (which he claims is a delicacy). But Kouga still has a chip left on him (hidden in Zaruba's mouth) so Kid is forced to get in a win-all card game with his dimensional cards used. When asked to put up collateral for the bet they search his heart to put up that which means most to him, which turns out to be an oblivious Kaoru. Though Kid has four aces and the Joker (which Zaruba had insisted they keep in the game) and is about to win, Kouga destroys the Joker card, which frees the captured gamblers. Furious that he has been tricked, Kid sics his Horror minions on Kouga before assuming his true form as the Horror Genojika. Donning his armor, Garo battles Genojika on rooftops before slaying him in midair. As they are about to leave Zaruba tells Kouga the hand he bluffed with would've been great... had they been playing Old Maid.
5	"Naraka"; Transliteration: "Naraku" (Japanese: 奈落)	Yasuko Kobayashi	November 3, 2011
A metal sculptor named Kōji Kijima creates his stylized manhole cover as art, which he tries to sell. His work is rejected by the local art community, however he is able to sell them to city authorities, who use them simply as actual manhole covers. Due to its design the cover becomes a Horror gate, from which a Horror named Dark Hole manifests and possesses a young woman. After visiting an art gallery, where Kaoru is assisting her mentor at his exhibition, Kaoru's mentor recognizes Kōji as an old college friend, however Kōji all but ignores him and leaves. Kōji is later visited by the Horror. Claiming to love his work, yet more intrigued by the strange darkness that emits from it, she convinces him to mass produce the manhole cover as part of her scheme to create more gateways for her kin. Kouga and Leo learn of this during their hunt for Death Hole when Kōji's art colleague almost falls victim to one such cover. Kaoru, recognizing the shaper's design, directs Kouga to look for Kōji while Leo seals all the manhole covers. Kouga discovers the Horror and defeats her swiftly as Garo. After the Horror's death the source to the gates darkness comes for Kōji, revealed as the specter of his wife Mayumi and her grudge over how (after berating her husbands attempts at becoming an artist) being left to die in the sewer by Kōji. Kouga arrives to find him dead and, upon destroying the last gateway, remarks that how or why Kōji died is not really his concern.
6	"Letter"; Transliteration: "Tegami" (Japanese: 手紙)	Itaru Era; Keita Amemiya	November 10, 2011
After a brief sparring match with Kouga, Rei investigates a Horror tree. In flashback we are told of the tree's owners, a husband and wife who invite people into the house to view the tree's unique shape when viewed from their house and to eat a snack of tea and their home grown vegetables. However, this is shown to be a trap where the guests are each poisoned and then buried under the tree, who rewards them in turn by letting them have dinner with a projection of their dead son. It is also shown how it was their son, a war photographer, collected the tree's seed not long before being killed in the line of fire. The owners invite Rei in to dinner and attempt to poison him, however he reveals that he has an immunity to poison, and he battles the Horror-possessed tree as Zero. Upon defeating the tree the owners see their son partially dissolve and explode into his war photos. They beg Rei to kill them but he refuses (as he only kills Horrors). The next day, unable to face the reality that their son is dead, the owners drink their own poisoned tea while talking of their sons final unfinished letter from the front.
7	"Flash"; Transliteration: "Senkō" (Japanese: 閃光)	Itaru Era; Keita Amemiya	November 17, 2011
Leo takes his leave on an escort mission leaving Kouga to escort Ratess, an aloof and rude Makai Priest, who is transporting the pelt of a Spirit Beast so the material can be used to make more Makai Brushes, the Makai Priests weapon of choice. While on his day away Leo meets Kaoru by chance and, when he allows her to hold his Makai Brush, is reminded of a woman from his past. That evening Kouga realizes the delivery is a trap, and he finds himself forced to try and retrieve the stolen pelt from the red-masked man who had previously marked him with the Seal of Destruction. During the long and destructive battle the masked man is shown to have both the skills of a Makai Priest and the swordsmanship of a Makai Knight. After revealing his wish to return to Makai Priests to their former glory (they dealt with Horrors before the creation of Makai Knights) he forces Kouga to transform and makes a black copy of Kouga's Garo armor, called Jaaku. While fighting in the storm blown rubble of a destroyed building Kouga realizes that dropping his armor will make the masked man's armor vanish, which he does. Exhausted and now with only half the pelt in his possession, the masked man runs away, Kouga unable to follow. Kouga sends the young Makai Dragon (named after Kaoru) in pursuit, but as it catches up to the masked man he destroys it swiftly.
8	"Demon Sword"; Transliteration: "Yōtō" (Japanese: 妖刀)	Itaru Era	November 24, 2011
In feudal Japan a samurai dying from illness duels across the land looking for a warriors death. He meets a strange, unholy warrior and, once he has destroyed his opponent, inherits the man's Horror-possessed blade. The blade puts him into an ageless coma only for the samurai to wake in modern day Japan. It is not long before he encounters Rei and challenges him to a duel upon witnessing Rei in his Zero armor. Rei relents and agrees to fight with sticks, abandoning the duel upon his victory. The samurai, sick of the Horror blades constant demand for blood, rams the sword into himself, thus becoming a Horror. He draws Rei in and forces him to a rematch, revealing he once saw a Makai Knight when he was a child. As they battle Rei is torn as he believes the man before him could have/should have been a Makai Knight and not a Horror. Rei eventually transforms and defeats the honorable warrior, granting him his desired death in battle. While leaving, Rei thinks about the samurai's final words, which reminds Rei of his friendly rivalry with, and of his desire to become a better Makai Knight then Kouga.
9	"Makeup"; Transliteration: "Keshō" (Japanese: 化粧)	Hisako Fujihira	December 1, 2011
An aging actor views in dismay as a pretty-boy pop singer with no acting talent hams his way through a play, though cheered on by his fangirls the whole time. Kouga and Kaoru are in attendance until Kouga leaves saying how he does not have time to waste. When the aging actor discovers a Horror hidden inside a make up kit he takes the chance to regain his youth and health and then kills the singer backstage so he can take his place as the star. The actor gets rave reviews and is ironically compared to the actor he was in his heyday. Though Gonza has tickets to see the next performance Kouga, who has been given orders to deal with the Horror, buys out the whole performance and, with Leo peacefully knocking out the crew, fights the star alone on stage. As the stage shifts into a scene resembling the Saejima mansion, Kouga dons his armor and bests the Horror, walking away as the curtain falls. Later Kouga returns home to find a crying Kaoru, who turns out to be performing the sadness to prove acting is not a waste of time.
10	"Secret"; Transliteration: "Himitsu" (Japanese: 秘密)	Keita Amemiya	December 8, 2011
While Kouga patiently sits in wait for a dangerous Horror, Leo examines a ceremonial Makai Sword at the Saejima estate. Kaoru learns Leo is searching for a Spirit Beast, not to hunt for its pelt but rather just to see it. Leo explains that seeing a Spirit Beast up close will mean you are blessed. Kaoru convinces a Leo to let her follow and he gives her an elixir to heighten her senses. As he shows her the world as the Makai Priests see it Kaoru encounters all the sights of both the beautiful light qi and the nightmarish dark qi within the city. As they travel Kaoru learns Leo wishes to have the Spirit Beast help him decorate a Makai Brush in his possession. The brush had lost its power and Leo cannot bring himself to dispose it. Kaoru, having figured out that the brush once belonged to somebody close to Leo, desires to have her paintbrush blessed too, Leo eventually agrees and tells her that if she made a beautiful painting of the beast with the paintbrush she should give it to somebody important to her. At the end of the path Leo creates a ritual to make time synch with the time flow of the beast itself and both Leo and Kaoru receive visions of their loved ones (in her case she sees Kouga) while being blessed. However on the way back an Origs, a vicious protector of the Spirit Beast, attacks them and Leo expertly defeats it using the ceremonial blade, much like a Makai Knight. Since Makai Priests are forbidden from learning swordsmanship, Leo swears Kaoru to secrecy, not wanting anyone (particularly Kouga), to know that he can fight with a blade. Kouga, having defeated the Horror and returned home slumps in his study due to the seal making him weak. Once he sees a picture of a Spirit Beast drawn by Kaoru left in his study he looks at it, smiling contentedly.
11	"Roaring"; Transliteration: "Hōkō" (Japanese: 咆哮)	Keita Amemiya	December 15, 2011
Kouga takes Kaoru and Gonza on a picnic near the tower that catches Kaoru's attention. Kouga reveals that the tower has a special importance, as it is the traditional place where he and all the previous Garos have inherited their title. The tower is also the place where all the past holders of the title of Garo are laid to rest after they have died. After Kouga enters the tower to be cleansed of the evil qi accumulated from his battles he sends Gonza home and has a walk with Kaoru, unaware that an evil is hunting him. During a warm talk with Kaoru, they come before the statue of a sphinx-like creature which Kouga says was modeled after a Horror. Suddenly time freezes and Kouga is confronted by a mysterious Horror who demands he fight him or he will kill the frozen Kaoru. The Horror tells Kouga that not only did he alter the flow of time, but that while they're in the altered reality, the time limit of Kouga's Makai armor would not be in effect. Kouga dons the Garo armor and first battles a clone of the Horror before facing the actual one in an arena. With assistance from the spirit of the first Garo Kouga learns his foe is actually Zazi, an accumulation of the revenge-driven spirits of the many Horrors that the Golden Knight destroyed. Realising that Zazi was using the statue as a gate, he slices part of its face off to negate Zazi's existence and restore the proper flow of time. Under the statue's face, Kouga and Kaoru notice ancient Makai writing that Zaruba translates to say "When the protector finds a light worth protecting, an ordeal will begin", implying his fight with Zazi was a test brought on by his attachment to Kaoru.
12	"Fruit"; Transliteration: "Kajitsu" (Japanese: 果実)	Kei Taguchi	December 22, 2011
Investigating the sight of a car crash where a Horror has manifested, Rei finds no bodies left behind and wonders if Horror entered the victim or the driver. The next day he encounters Misao Hoshikawa, a girl from his past, and spends the whole day with her. Seeing her troubled, Rei tells Misao that she should live life her way, pursuing her own dreams, instead of just following the wishes of her mother. After parting ways, Rei talks with Silva about "cutting her down". Returning home, Misao is interrogated by her mother Toshiko before being physically abused for the crepe she ate with Rei. Toshiko then comforts her into agreeing to become a pâtissière like her and never see Rei again. By nightfall, Rei arrives to the Hoshikawas' home to find both of them gone. Finding Misao at the fairground where they first met, they reminisce back to when they first met, when, as a little girl, Rei saved Misao from being hit by a car. As a show of gratitude, Misao and Toshiko's gave Rei several slices of a strawberry tart, which gave him his sweet tooth. Rei then confesses that he was not looking to once again eat Toshiko's pastries, at which point he draws his swords; in the reflections of his blades we see that Toshiko has suddenly appeared out of nowhere. It is revealed that, wanting not to follow in her mother's footsteps, Misao had run away from home and intended to throw herself before a speeding car. However, Toshiko pushes her out of the way and is hit by the car instead as it crashed. Taking advantage of the situation, the Horror Yashaul enters Toshiko's body before devouring the driver. Since then Misao's guilt is manipulated by the Horror as she refuses to let Rei kill her. Knocking Misao out and donning his armor, Zero battles Yashaul before killing her. Presented with mother's necklace, Misao at first thanks Rei for his mercy but then tells him that she can never forgive him for what he did. Rei, however, leaves confident that she will learn to smile again.
13	"Enduring Water"; Transliteration: "Sensui" (Japanese: 仙水)	Yuji Kobayashi; Kei Taguchi	January 5, 2012
When the enduring water which acts as Zaruba's lifeblood becomes stagnant to the point of placing him in horrific pain, Kouga contacts his childhood friend Jabi to take the Madō Ring to the Life-Circulating Waterfall within Jewel Forest in order for the waterfall's waters to restore him. Jabi, motivated by how her mentor created Zaruba, is happy to do a favor for Kouga as he gives her a Barchess piece as a sign of mutual trust. Leo also gives Jabi a magic compass to help find her way to Life-Circulating Waterfall, however the item "suddenly fails" on her as she manages to reach her destination. After rejuvenating Zaruba in the water, Jabi is attacked by the red-masked man as he uses a small number of Gōryūjin he created to try and steal Zaruba for the sake of his ritual in order to make dream of a world as it was before, when Makai Knights did not exist, and Makai Priests were the ones protecting humans against Horrors. Jabi admits that she also hopes for a world where people need not fear Horrors, but also points out that the only reason why the Makai Knights were created was because Makai Priests were unable to effectively fight Horrors on their own. Though she is on the verge of losing, Jabi uses Kouga's Barchess piece to summon Garo's steed Gōten and use it in a flash tactic to retrieve Zaruba. The red-masked man respectfully allows her to enjoy the victory and leaves. Jabi and Zaruba decide to keep the battle from Kouga a secret so as not to worry him. After returning Zaruba to waiting Kouga, Jabi advises him to be careful around Makai Priests, lightly implying that Leo is not all that he appears.
14	"Reunion"; Transliteration: "Saikai" (Japanese: 再会)	Itaru Era	January 12, 2012
News comes to Kouga from the Senate that Hyuga, an apprentice to the Kantai area's Makai Knight Tsubasa, Dan the Knight of the Midnight Sun, is attacked by the rouge Makai Knight Wataru Shijima, known as Baron the Thunder Knight. Kouga and Leo are sent not only to find and capture Wataru, they are also given orders to kill the Makai Knight if he truly embraced the darkness. Finding Baron as he duels against Dan, Kouga intervenes yet allows Wataru to escape to everyone's shock. By then, it is revealed that Tsubasa was also marked with the Seal of Destruction and is suffering due to his repeated use of his Makai armor. While having Leo tend to Tsubasa's wounds, Kouga explains that he will not kill Wataru as Leo points out the fact that it must be for the sake of Wataru's son. However, chiding Leo as a Makai Priest for his ignorance on the matter, Tsubasa states that Makai Knights are ready to die with their loved ones also prepared for the event. But as Kouga attempts to talk a wounded and sick Tsubasa from leaving, Hyuga arrives and reveals that Wataru stabbed himself in the leg to stop himself from killing the youth earlier. With this knowledge that Wataru is having his own internal struggle, brought about by the red-masked man's enchantment, Kouga arrives to the cave Wataru is hiding in to help him overcome his inner darkness. Forced to raise his armor to battle the conflicted Baron, Garo appears to be on the losing end when Tsubasa arrives and dons his armor to assist, with the battle ending when Dan is able to pin down Baron so Garo can stab through him to shatter the gem twisting Wataru's personality. As his vital organs were not harmed in the gambit, Tsubasa tells Kouga though he is ready to die he will not foolishly race to his demise. Wataru, now returned to normal, thanks Kouga, and, upon seeing a decoration on Kouga's jacket, realises the two have met before as they part ways.
15	"Brethren"; Transliteration: "Harakara" (Japanese: 同胞)	Itaru Era	January 19, 2012
After being ranked the lowest team of Makai Knights in training Yamabuki Squad, a group of four boys named after the colors of their bandanas due to mandate, are placed under the watch of Wataru Shijima, who is known for his draconian methods. After Wataru introduces himself to the boys, he proceeds to train "Yamabuki" (Kerria yellow), "Shiro" (White), "Murasaki" (Purple), and "Akane" (Madder red) for ten horrific days. Eventually, unable to deal with the mental and physical strain of their training, Akane considers quitting but an unexpected visit a Makai Priestess wanting to be a Makai Knight and the encouragement of his team convinces the boy to continue. Eventually, having improved greatly over time, the Yamabuki Squad talks about their upcoming match with the Kuro (Black) Squad while showing off their scars from training. The next day, during the Bell-Slashing match, Murasaki is forced to use his Madō Brush to save Akane but they still lose the match. Though they lose to the Kuro Squad and are now at the bottom rank due to Murasaki's action, Wataru praises the Yamabuki Squad for learning a valuable lesson in comradery and awards them each with a trinket to remind them of their friendship with each other. That night, feeling better in themselves, the four return to camp when the Horror Raizon attacks. Before Wataru can transform into Baron to scare the Horror off, Kuro and Yamabuki are killed instantly, and Murasaki sacrifices himself in vain to save Akane who still ends up being killed by the Horror, leaving Shiro the only one of his squad alive. Many years later Kouga, revealed to have been the child nicknamed Shiro, finds Raizon and swiftly destroys the Horror as Garo. After recanting the tale of his training to Gonza, Kaoru, and Leo, Kouga bids farewell to the spirits of his childhood friends, who cheer him on and tell him to continue in their stead as Garo.
16	"Mask"; Transliteration: "Kamen" (Japanese: 仮面)	Itaru Era; Keita Amemiya	January 26, 2012
With orders from the Senate to now work together, Rei teams with the Makai Knight Koori against a mysterious Demon Beast that only has the vague aura of a Horror. Though initially successful, it revives and kills Koori, causing Rei to retaliate as Zero until pain from the Seal of Destruction prevents him from landing the killing blow, giving the Demon Beast chance to escape. Rei speaks to Kouga the next day on how each of their seals are simultaneously counting down to activation, but they have no way of telling how long they have because neither Zaruba nor Silva can read the countdown cyphers. Resolved to continue their battles, the two Makai Knights decide to track the creature Rei failed to destroy together. Meanwhile Kaoru, anxiously racing to meet the deadline to submit her storybook, encounters Leo by chance while he too is investigating the Demon Beast. Though she is excited by having just thought up the end of her story, Leo regretfully tells her that he is leaving and will not see any of them for a while, though he is vague as to why he is leaving. Kouga and Rei track the Demon Beast from the stone's aura that made its armor to a warehouse, only to find not only that it is a dormant machine but also that it was controlled by the red-masked man. Forced at first to battle the red-masked man's Gōryūjin, the two fight the red-masked man himself briefly, though they are clearly outmatched. The red-masked man opts then to pilot Rigl, another of his Gōryū creations, believing it will bring a fitting end to both Makai Knights. Garo and Zero at first struggle, but they eventually fell the machine after calling on their respective Madō Horses and with a display of team work. With the machine destroyed, Rei is able to distract the red-masked man long enough for Kouga to stab the mask, removing it to reveal the face of Leo. The red-masked man remarks he does not answer to the name Leo and vanishes, leaving the Knights angered and in shock.
17	"Red Brush"; Transliteration: "Akafude" (Japanese: 赤筆)	Itaru Era; Keita Amemiya	February 2, 2012
With the identity of the red-masked man seemingly revealed, Rekka and Kouga work together to hunt Sendinbale, a Horror that uses written characters as gates that was released by the red-masked man. Sedinbale hunts Kaoru, who is close to finishing her storybook. Due to viewing the battle between Rekka, Kouga and the Horror Kaoru finally finds out about Kouga's Seal of Destruction and that he has a short time left to live. Though the news upsets her greatly, for his sake, Kaoru resolves to maintain a strong facade in front of Kouga, so that he can continue to be an effective protector. Rekka admires Kaoru for this and, before departing, conjures a new Makai Dragon for Kouga.
18	"Herd"; Transliteration: "Gunjū" (Japanese: 群獣)	Itaru Era; Keita Amemiya	February 9, 2012
At the Senate, Kouga expresses his doubts whether Leo is truly the red-masked man. However, Grace and Ratess both believe it is him. With more questions than answers, Kouga wants to know more about Leo's past and Ratess reveals that the Makai genealogy has been mysteriously erased, suggesting that Leo has covered his tracks. Because of the rising conflict between the Knights and Priests, there has been great suspicion that there is a traitor within the Senate walls attempting to usurp the Makai Order. It is later revealed that Ratess has sided with the red-masked man and joined his cause. Ratess runs off with the very pelts that help create Makai Brushes, Kouga gives chase and follows him through other dimensions. However, Ratess escapes by sending Kouga through a portal into a cave filled with Horrors. Although Zaruba is concerned for Kouga's well-being for transforming into Garo, Kouga takes the risk. Garo plows through the Horrors, destroying the cave on his way out. Back out of the cave, Kouga makes it to find Ratess being killed by the red-masked man. Tired of Kouga's constant interference, the red-masked man unleashes two Tekkis in an attempt to finish off the weakened Kouga. To their surprise Leo arrives to stop the attack. Lacking and needing power after a brief skirmish, the second Leo reveals his true nature, that he is actually Lord, the Flash Knight.
19	"Paradise"; Transliteration: "Rakuen" (Japanese: 楽園)	Itaru Era; Keita Amemiya	February 16, 2012
As Kouga watches red-masked man and Lord battle against each other, he overhears Leo refer to the other as "Brother". It is later revealed that red-masked man is Leo's elder twin, Sigma and thus he was the one who branded the Makai Knights with the Seal of Destruction. Sigma thought he and Leo had the same ideals, but Leo no longer agrees with his views and pleads for Sigma to surrender. Infuriated, Sigma disowns Leo as his brother and escapes by self-destructing his creations. Later at Saejima manor, Kouga, Rei, and Leo have a discussion of recent events. Rei says that he intends to concede to Sigma's demands of the Makai Knights surrendering to the Makai Priests. Rei believes all of the infighting is costing civilian lives and it is pointless to maintain his Makai Knighthood in such a fashion. It is then that Leo decides to tell the two everything: Sigma and Leo are the twin sons of the Gōki Fudō, the previous Makai Knight Lord, and both were raised to become potential inheritors to that title. Under the harsh training from their Makai Knight father, the two became strong warriors. Of the two, Sigma was the most talented in combat as well as magic. Upon adulthood, Sigma was infuriated to know he was denied of his expected inheritance and disappeared for several years. Leo demanded to know why did his father chose him over Sigma, despite the latter's superior abilities, and Gōki explained the most important characteristic for a Makai Knight to have is the heart of a protector, something that Sigma lacked. Years later, Sigma would return as a skilled Makai Priest. Along with a fellow priest, his mute girlfriend Mio, the two intended to create the ultimate Gōryū, the Magōryū Idea, to permanently eliminate the Horror blight for the rest of time. It was their research that revealed they can utilize Horrors as an energy source to generate the necessary energy to power Idea. With Mio's research, Sigma found the resting place of the corpse of the Horror Gyanon, with the intent to use the corpse as a power source for Idea. Mio felt uncomfortable about the matter and sought Leo's advice over this matter. Still having faith in his brother, Leo comforted Mio that Sigma would not misuse his powers, but also offered her a place to stay if she wanted to remain with him. However, upon seeing Sigma use a prostitute's corpse to create Gigi, and his intentions of using impure humans as fuel for Idea, Mio could not accept Sigma's methods and decided to destroy Gyanon. Unfortunately, her attempt led to her death, causing the rift between Leo and Sigma. It is not long until Sigma makes a public announcement for all Makai Knights to either renounce their titles and give up their Makai armor or face death from their Seals of Destruction. However, he makes it clear that Kouga will not be spared.
20	"Train"; Transliteration: "Ressha" (Japanese: 列車)	Itaru Era; Keita Amemiya	February 23, 2012
At the Senate, all the cursed Makai Knights gather and are divided between those who intend to giving up their armors while the other half refuse to discard their armor and will force the other group to see things their way. After figuring out Sigma's method of killing all the Makai Knights with the power of the moon, and that he obtained the key to the Madō Train from killing Ratess to reach the True Demon World to create Idea there, Kouga and Rei intervene at the Senate to calm the situation while promising to find a way to resolve their Seals of Destruction. However, using his Gōryūjin to create a barrier to seal in all the Makai Knights; the promise of mercy to the conceding Makai Knights nothing more than lie, Sigma boards the Madō Train with the corpse of Gyanon stored in the caboose. Using a combination of the Madō Train's traveling abilities and the moon's charging powers, he intends to open a portal to enter the True Demon World to realize Idea (at the same time, entering the portal would cause the Seals of Destruction to activate, killing all of the Makai Knights). As a result, Leo is forced to board the train on his own and face Sigma. Left with no choice, Kouga makes a contract with Gajari to help teleport him to the Madō Train and come to Leo's aid. With the intervention of Leo and Kouga before the former is knocked out of the train, Sigma's plans are thwarted when Kouga dons his armor to derail the train before cutting off Sigma's left Horror-covered arm, which breaks the Seals of Destruction on the Makai Knights as the train plummets to the ground.
21	"Stronghold"; Transliteration: "Gajō" (Japanese: 牙城)	Itaru Era; Keita Amemiya	March 1, 2012
After surviving the battle and crash of the Madō Train, Kouga awakens to find Sigma equally alive and Gyanon's corpse is intact. Using Gyanon's corpse, Sigma regenerates his cut-off hand and reveals that he has a backup plan that involves Kouga. As the other Makai Knights deal with the Horrors manifested as the result of the opened portal the Madō Train created, Rei and Leo arrive to the site of the crash where they find Kouga being assimilated into Gyanon with their attempts to get him out failing before Sigma takes the Horror away. When Rekka arrives and her attempt to reach Kouga fails, she brings in Kaoru to aid them. Jabi soon joins the group and six head to Amber Rock Valley where Sigma is beginning the ritual.
22	"Sworn Friends"; Transliteration: "Meiyū" (Japanese: 盟友)	Itaru Era; Keita Amemiya	March 8, 2012
Rei, Leo, Rekka, Jabi, Kaoru, and Gonza arrive to the Amber Rock Valley dig site where Gyanon was originally buried to save Kouga from Sigma realizing Idea. Leo and Rei takes on an army of Gōryūjin and receives unexpected assistance of Wataru. Meanwhile, Jabi and Rekka escorts Kaoru into Idea's core to find Gyanon and free Kouga. However, Sigma's minion Gigi has followed them. The two priestesses battle and eventually defeat Sigma's follower while Kaoru reaches Kouga. Kaoru manages to liberate Kouga by reminding him of who he is with the last page of her father's book, Golden Knight and the Black Flame. With Gigi destroyed and Kouga freed, the group manages to escape Idea. Moments later, Sigma transports the incomplete Idea into the True Demon World to complete his creation. Wataru, Rei, and Leo follow by riding the core of Idea. The trio witnesses Idea's completion, as well as a display of its power as it destroys an entire horde of Horrors. After telling Jabi and Rekka to take Kaoru to safety, Kouga enters the True Demon World to join in the pursuit but must cut through his blocked path. The other three Makai Knights find Sigma within Idea's helm and are overwhelmed by him before he attempts to retrieve more power from Gyanon's corpse to replenish his strength. To everyone's surprise, Gyanon awakens and devours Sigma before revealing its true form. When Gyanon begins assimilating Idea, the Makai Knights retreat and watch as the greatest anti-Horror weapon ever made becomes an extension of Gyanon's body.
23	"Golden"; Transliteration: "Konjiki" (Japanese: 金色)	Itaru Era; Keita Amemiya	March 15, 2012
Having absorbed Idea, Gyanon summons an army of Horrors and ushers them to Earth through the Amber Rock Valley dig site's portal. Rekka and Jabi intercept the incoming Horrors before receiving aid from Shiguto and the other Makai Priests while Garo arrives on Gōten to aid his fellow Makai Knights in destroying the Horrors' portal then charges at Gyanon. Though revealing that Sigma's darkness reviving him was by mere chance, Gyanon reveals his intention to bring all Horrors into the human world. After Gyannon repels him and the Makai Knights attempt to cut off one of Idea's legs. However, Idea regenerates its severed limb, disarming Rei and Wataru before making its way to the center of a circle of pillars that would transport it to the human world. Garo makes a risky move by attacking the upper tower of Idea to halt its entry with the Makai Priests providing suppression fire with their combined magics to keep Idea down. Leo reveals the exposed core that can be damaged with the Shooting Star of Light Arrow technique that he prepares as Tsubasa comes and relieves Wataru. Garo, Zero, and Dan charge on their Madō Horses as Gyanon unleashes Idea's built-in army of Gōryū to battle the three Makai Knights while having Idea raise back up. The fight seems hopeless until an army of Makai Knights joins the battle to stop Gyanon. As Leo sends a note to Jabi, the Makai Knights begin destroying the transport pillars, trapping Idea in the True Demon World.
24	"Era"; Transliteration: "Jidai" (Japanese: 時代)	Itaru Era; Keita Amemiya	March 22, 2012
After ensuring Idea would not enter their world, the other Makai Knights receive the Madō Brushes of the Makai Priests and use them to create multiple Shooting Star of Light Arrow to destroy Idea. Surviving as a head, Gyanon attempts to take his wrath upon Garo before being destroyed by Garo with Kaoru's Spirit Beast-infused brush. Though Gyanon is defeated and peace between the Makai Knights and Priests is restored, Kouga comes to Gajari to honor his contract: Learning his labor is to travel to the Promised Land to retrieve a part of Gajari's body. While Leo accompanies him to his manor to say his goodbye to Kaoru, Kouga discovers that Sigma is still alive. Using Kaoru as a hostage, Sigma intending to get revenge on Kouga for ruining his plans before his body fails him. In their final match, Sigma sets up an anti-Maki armor barrier while uprooting Saejima manor from its foundations. Though he initially holds back, Kouga reveals that they met as children in Makai Knight training and must cut him down to honor their promise and kills Sigma as his manor breaks apart. Donning Garo around himself and Kaoru, Kouga tells her that he must leave but promises to return once finishing his contract. Before he goes, Kouga bids Kaoru farewell with a final kiss before leaving her to be found by Gonza. As Gonza and Leo find Kaoru's painting from the wreckage, Rekka goes under Jabi's wing to refine her skills, Tsubasa and Wataru train the next generation of Makai Knights, as Rei and Shiguto return to their posts. After the successfully launch of her book, The White Spirit Beast and the Mysterious Forest, Kaoru goes to the park. There, enveloped in a golden light, Kaoru sees someone much to her joy.
25	"Garo Special My Name Is Garo: The History of Kouga Saejima's Battles"; Transliteration: "Garo Supesharu Waga Na wa Garo -Saejima Kōga Tatakai no Kiseki-" (Japanese: 牙狼〈GARO〉スペシャル 我が名は牙狼―冴島鋼牙 戦いの軌跡―)	N/A	March 29, 2012
A look back at the life of Kouga Saejima, the Golden Knight Garo. The special ends with an extra scene set before Kouga's final battle with Sigma: Kouga's friends bidding him good luck on his journey to the Promised Ground and look on him one last time as Garo.
