= Garo Gaiden: Tōgen no Fue =

- Theatrical poster

Japanese name
- Kanji: 牙狼外伝～桃幻の笛～
Transcriptions
- Revised Hepburn: Garo Gaiden Tōgen no Fue
- Directed by: Akira Ohashi
- Written by: Keita Amemiya; Hisako Fujihira
- Produced by: Tamae Otonashi
- Starring: Yasue Sato; Mary Matsuyama
- Cinematography: Akira Nishioka
- Edited by: Tomoki Nagasaka
- Music by: Shunji Inoue; JAM Project
- Production company: Tohokushinsha Film
- Distributed by: Tohokushinsha Film
- Release date: July 20, 2013
- Running time: 60 minutes
- Country: Japan
- Language: Japanese

Garo Gaiden: Tōgen no Fue (牙狼外伝～桃幻の笛～, Garo Gaiden Tōgen no Fue; lit. "Garo Side Story: The Tougen Flute") (Note: "Tōgen" when written as 桃源 means a type of utopia.) is a Japanese superhero film based on the Garo television series, in particular the events of the second season Garo: Makai Senki. It serves as a spin-off from Makai Senki and stars Yasue Sato and Mary Matsuyama as Jabi and Rekka, two Makai Priestesses from the metaseries. The catchphrase for the movie is "Is that note of light or of darkness?" (その音色は、光か闇か。, Sono neiro wa, hikari ka yami ka.). Tougen no Fue received a limited theatrical release on July 20, 2013.

== Plot ==
Long ago, a fallen Makai Priestess named Higari became too powerful and after tampering with powers no one should wield, she had to be stopped and was eventually sealed away by another Makai Priest named Sougen. Using his body and his own life, he created the Tougen Flute and sealed Higari shortly after his death. However, through a special ritual, those who seek Higari's power can resurrect her by replaying eight notes on the Tougen Flute to undo Sougen's seal. In the present, while Kouga Saejima has travelled to the Promised Land, two fallen priests will attempt to return Higari.

Agi and Magi are Makai Priestesses and lovers. Magi is suffering from an unspecified terminal illness and Agi swears to find a means to cure her so both of them can be together. By discovering the remains of Higari, the two summon her and use her power to sustain Magi. However, they must serve Higari. Once the two resurrect Higari, the duo are rewarded with immortality. To complete the resurrection though, they need to find a priest who can see the remains of Sougen as a flute and not a set of bones.

Eventually, Magi finds Rekka, while Agi finds Jabi; both priests are suitable candidates to return Higari. The dark duo tricks Jabi and Rekka, each telling them a partial truth of the Tougen Flute's nature and that a fallen priest seeks to use the flute for dark purposes. Through a series of misunderstandings (caused by the dark duo), Jabi and Rekka think of each other as the fallen priest. However, the two eventually figure out the truth and rejoin as allies.

In a final battle between Agi and Magi, the two are no match for Jabi and Rekka. Magi continues to be desperate to live and sacrifices Agi to complete Higari's resurrection. However, Higari does not honor her part of the bargain, and instead devours both Agi and Magi before attacking Rekka and Jabi. Ultimately, the two utilize a powerful Scarlet Bird Flame Formation and defeat Higari. Afterwards, the two place the Agi and Magi's wands over in a shrine and hope they find peace in the afterlife. The story ends with Jabi and Rekka leaving to watch the Makai Knight competition that occurs in Garo: Soukoku no Maryu.

== Cast ==
- Jabi (邪美): Yasue Sato (佐藤 康恵, Satō Yasue)
- Rekka (烈花): Mary Matsuyama (松山 メアリ, Matsuyama Meari)
- Shiguto (シグト): Masahiro Kuranuki (倉貫 匡弘, Kuranuki Masahiro)
- Rin (鈴): Yuzumi Shibamoto (柴本 優澄美, Shibamoto Yuzumi)
- Sougen (壮幻, Sōgen): Makoto Ito (伊藤 慎, Itō Makoto)
- Kengi (ケンギ): Kanji Tsuda (津田 寛治, Tsuda Kanji)
- Agi (阿妓): Kumi Takiuchi (瀧内 公美, Takiuchi Kumi)
- Magi (麻妓): Miku Oono (大野 未来, Ōno Miku)
- Higari (翡刈): Hitomi Takahashi (高橋 ひとみ)

== Songs ==
Opening theme

- "Tougen no Fue" (桃幻の笛, Tōgen no Fue; The Tougen Flute)
  - Composition: Yoshichika Kuriyama, Shiho Terada

Ending theme

- "Wildflowers"
  - Lyrics: Masami Okui
  - Composition: Hiroshi Kitadani
  - Arrangement: Kenichi Sudō
  - Artist: JAM Project
