= Kami no Kiba: Jinga =

2018 Japanese TV series

- Genre: Tokusatsu; Horror; Drama
- Created by: Keita Amemiya
- Written by: Shu Tadokoro; Taizo Shioda; Rio Morita
- Directed by: Yoshiomi Umetsu; Jubei Ino; Hidenori Higure; Akihito Shimoda; Masahiro Inoue
- Starring: Masahiro Inoue; Yuuka Kouri; Sōshi Hagiwara; Miyavi Matsunoi
- Opening theme: "Dōkoku no Kanata" by JAM Project
- Ending theme: "Dōkoku no Kanata ~Instrumental Version~"
- Country of origin: Japan
- Original language: Japanese
- No. of episodes: 13

Production
- Executive producer: Kiyotaka Ninomiya
- Producers: Yōsuke Hayashi; Takuya Nishi
- Running time: 24-25 minutes (per episode)

Original release
- Network: Tokyo MX
- Release: October 4 – December 27, 2018

Related
- Zero: Dragon Blood; GARO; Garo: Gold Storm Sho

Kami no Kiba: Jinga (神ノ牙－JINGA－, lit. "Fang of God: Jinga") is a Japanese television series, spin-off from the Garo metaseries. The series focuses on Jinga, now a reincarnated Makai Knight while facing his past darkness he assumed during the events of Garo: Gold Storm Sho and the film Garo: Kami no Kiba. Masahiro Inoue reprised his role on the lead character.

== Plot ==
After the former Makai Knight turned Horror Jinga was defeated by Ryuga Dougai as Garo during the events of Garo: Kami no Kiba, he returned to the Makai Realm and challenged Messiah. He lost that battle and his soul drifted through the darkness for a time; he somehow found himself reborn into the light again. Unaware of his dark past life, he's reborn into the Mikage family and became a Makai Knight once again. His new life hasn't been easy as his father, Mizuto Mikage, turned to the dark side and became a Horror, killing his wife before being slayed by him. While still recovering from the incident, Jinga becomes partners with Makai Priest Fusa while managing the training of his little brother Toma, later gaining by accident a power that allows him to purify Horrors without killing their hosts, something never seen before in the long history of the Makai Knights, which draws the attention of the Watchdogs. But no one suspects the true nature of Jinga's abilities as his past-life is beginning to re-surface from within him.

== Episodes ==
No.	Title	Written by	Original release date
0	"Jinga / Jinga" (Japanese: 神牙／ジンガ)	Shu Tadokoro	October 4, 2018
After being defeated by the Horror Messiah, Jinga, a fallen Makai Knight reincarnates into the Mikage family with no memories of his past self. Once an adult, he is forced to kill his father, a Makai Knight who also turned into darkness, and now Jinga must fight a Horror who develops affection towards the children of its host, and must confront his tragic past again.
1	"Destruction / Rebirth"; Transliteration: "Shōmetsu / Saisei" (Japanese: 消滅／再生)	Taizo Shioda	October 11, 2018
Now partnered with Makai Priest Fusa, Jinga must deal with a Horror that possessed a girl who is being tormented by her classmates, but after slaying it, something that they've never seen before startles them.
2	"Despair / Hope"; Transliteration: "Zetsubō / Kibō" (Japanese: 絶望／希望)	Taizo Shioda	October 18, 2018
Jinga and Fusa take Jinga's little brother Toma to a Horror hunt as part of his training. However, when facing a Horror that uses one's darkest memories against them, Toma becomes its host, and Jinga must rely on his new power to bring him back.
3	"Determination / Malice"; Transliteration: "Ketsui / Akui" (Japanese: 決意／悪意)	Taizo Shioda	October 25, 2018
Jinga's next enemy is a wrestler turned Horror after his family was killed by a thug, and since then only attacks criminals.
4	"Doubts / Awakening"; Transliteration: "Ginen / Mezame" (Japanese: 疑念／目覚)	Rio Morita	November 1, 2018
The Watchdogs send Makai Knights Rozan and his disciple Shijo to investigate Jinga's abilities and confirm if he is a threat or not.
5	"Stupor / Teaching"; Transliteration: "Konmei / Kyōji" (Japanese: 混迷／教示)	Shu Tadokoro	November 8, 2018
Fusa goes on a solo mission to investigate Horror victims related to a hostess club, unaware of Jinga's sudden and ominous change.
6	"Outside / Inside"; Transliteration: "Omote / Ura" (Japanese: 表／裏)	Shu Tadokoro	November 15, 2018
Rozan investigate Shijo's disappearance while Jinga is confronted by his other self, who attempts to draw him to darkness.
7	"Bonds / Breaking"; Transliteration: "Kizuna / Dan" (Japanese: 絆／断)	Shu Tadokoro	November 22, 2018
Fearing for Toma's safety, Jinga decides to take him back to Makai practitioners' village to continue his training with the other Makai Knight apprentices, but determined to prove that he is strong enough to continue traveling with his brother, Toma challenges Subaru, the strongest of the apprentices there, for a match.
8	"Blind Faith / Doubts"; Transliteration: "Mōshin / Kaigi" (Japanese: 盲信／懐疑)	Shu Tadokoro	November 29, 2018
Ugai, a Makai Priest capable to locate Horrors faster than the Watchdogs, asks for Jinga's help to rescue as many humans as possible. Their new partnership is a success, but Fusa is more and more wary of Jinga's behavior.
9	"No Beginning / No End"; Transliteration: "Mushi / Mujū" (Japanese: 無始／無終)	N/A	December 6, 2018
Certain that he is doing the right thing, Jinga keeps defying the Watchdogs until he discovers that one of the people he turned back to human returned to his evil ways.
10	"Self-Conceit / Predicament"; Transliteration: "Dokuson / Kyūchi" (Japanese: 独尊／窮地)	Shu Tadokoro	December 13, 2018
Fusa has another encounter with the other Jinga, much to her grief, while the Watchdogs send Rosan to arrest Jinga for his transgressions.
11	"Just Cause of Fiction / Truth of Reality"; Transliteration: "Kyokō no Taigi / Jijitsu no Shinri" (Japanese: 虚構の大義／事実の真理)	Shu Tadokoro; Taizo Shioda	December 20, 2018
Jinga resists and starts killing his pursuers to escape, until his other self appears to confront him.
12	"Demise/Genesis"; Transliteration: "Shūen/Sōsei" (Japanese: 終焉／創成)	Shu Tadokoro; Taizo Shioda	December 27, 2018
The Horror Jinga reveals the truth behind Jinga's power and puts the final touches in his master plan.

== Cast ==
- Jinga Mikage (御影 神牙, Mikage Jinga), Jinga (ジンガ): Masahiro Inoue (井上 正大, Inoue Masahiro)
- Fusa (楓沙, Fūsa): Yuuka Kouri (向里 憂香, Kōri Yūka)
- Toma Mikage (御影 刀眞, Mikage Tōma): Sōshi Hagiwara (萩原 壮志, Hagiwara Sōshi)
- Amily (アミリ, Amiri), Madō Ring Alva (魔導輪アルヴァ, Madōrin Aruva; Voice): Miyavi Matsunoi (松野井 雅, Matsunoi Miyabi)
- Kerus (ケルス, Kerusu): Misaki Yumoto (湯本 美咲, Yumoto Misaki)
- Rumido (ルミド): Arihiro Iwata (岩田 有弘, Iwata Arihiro)
- Ramedo (ラメド): Daisuke Sato (佐藤 大介, Satō Daisuke)
- Koyuri Mikage (御影 小百合, Mikage Koyuri): Satomi Ando (安藤 聡海, Andō Satomi)
- Rozan (狼斬): Koh Takasugi (高杉 亘, Takasugi Kō)
- Yoyu (葉祐, Yōyū): Shigemitsu Ogi (小木 茂光, Ogi Shigemitsu)
- Mizuto Mikage (御影 瑞人, Mikage Mizuto): Toru Kazama (風間 トオル, Kazama Tōru)
- Horrors (ホラー, Horā; Voice): Rintarō Nishi (西 凛太朗, Nishi Rintarō)

== Theme songs ==
Opening theme

- "Dōkoku no Kanata" (慟哭の彼方; "Beyond Lamentation")
  - Lyrics: Masami Okui
  - Composition: Hironobu Kageyama
  - Arrangement: Hisashi Koyama
  - Artist: JAM Project

Ending theme

- "Dōkoku no Kanata ~Instrumental Version~" (慟哭の彼方～Instrumental Version～; "Beyond Lamentation ~Instrumental Version~")
  - Composition: Hironobu Kageyama
  - Arrangement: Shiho Terada, Yoshichika Kuriyama
