= Garo Project =

Japanese musical ensemble

GARO Project is a Japanese musical ensemble made up of the cast of the Garo television series. As a group, they released two singles in 2006 that featured the ending themes of the TV series and the made-for-TV movie Garo Special: Beast of the Demon Night.

== Members ==
- Masaki Kyomoto: Producer, lyricist, composer, and guitarist. Portrayed Karune Ryuzaki/Barago/Kiba in Garo.
- Hiroki Konishi: Vocals. Portrayed Kouga Saejima/Garo in Garo.
- Ray Fujita: Vocals and chorus. Portrayed Rei Suzumura/Zero in Garo.
- Mika Hijii: Chorus. Portrayed Kaoru Mitsuki in Garo.
- Hiroyuki Watanabe: Drums and chorus. Portrayed Taiga Saejima/former Garo in Garo.

== Discography ==
- "Garo ~Boku ga Ai o Tsutaeteyuku~" (牙狼～僕が愛を伝えてゆく～; "Garo ~I'll Keep Showing You My Love~") - July 26, 2006
  - C/W "Boku wa Mada Koi o Shite wa Ikenai" (僕はまだ恋をしてはいけない; "I Shouldn't Still Be Loving")
- "Akai Bara" (赤いバラ; "Red Rose") - November 26, 2006
  - C/W "Aurora no Shita de" (オーロラの下で, Ōrora no Shita de; "Under the Aurora")
