= Garo: Red Requiem =

- Theatrical poster

Japanese name
- Kanji: 牙狼〈GARO〉 ～RED REQUIEM～
- Directed by: Keita Amemiya
- Written by: Itaru Eda; Keita Amemiya
- Produced by: Kentaro Yoshida
- Starring: Ryosei Konishi; Mary Matsuyama; Yôsuke Saitô; Masahiro Kuranuki; Hironobu Kageyama
- Music by: Shunji Inoue
- Production company: Tohokushinsha Film
- Release date: October 30, 2010
- Running time: 97 minutes
- Country: Japan
- Language: Japanese

Garo: Red Requiem (牙狼〈GARO〉 ～RED REQUIEM～) is a 2010 Japanese 3-D superhero film directed by Keita Amemiya, produced by Tohokushinsha Film, and based on their tokusatsu series Garo. It was released in theaters on October 30, 2010. Ryosei Konishi reprises his role from the television series, while introducing new characters such as the one portrayed by Mary Matsuyama. Mika Hijii, who portrayed Kaoru in the original series, returns to voice a different character.

The catchphrase for the movie is "The Golden Knight Runs Into the 3D Hell!" (3Dの魔界を黄金騎士が駆ける!, Surī Dī no Makai o Ōgon Kishi ga Kakeru!).

Red Requiem was released on Blu-ray/DVD on August 2, 2011, in Japan and on Blu-Ray in Region 1 areas on April 10, 2018, through Kraken Releasing.

== Plot ==
After the events of Beast of the Demon Night, Kouga received new orders to hunt and slay Apostle Horror Karma. Karma's followers, Kurusu and Shion, have been luring various girls within a gothic club (called Crime) to send them into Karma's mirror realm to be devoured. Makai Priests Akaza, Shiguto, and Rekka were slaying a horror to save a baby when they realized the child is actually Apostle Horror Babel. Kouga arrives to help slay the demon, but Rekka interferes as she wants to personally defeat Babel. Kouga kept her aside and donned his armor to slay the horror. After the battle, everyone makes their introductions and Kouga explains he's after Karma; Rekka declared Karma is her target and won't allow anyone to interfere in avenging her father (killed knight). However, no one can find Karma despite the evil presence they are feeling around the city.

The next day, Kouga found Rekka and asked why she's after Karma. Rekka reasoned she became a priestess to take down horrors like Karma, but Kouga felt that's a job for knights. Rekka argued that was a convenient imposition since it was the priests that first fought the horrors. However, Zaruba argued the knights were created because the priests weren't strong enough to handle the horrors in the first place. Rekka magically silenced Zaruba and made it clear she has the ability to seal horrors and storm off.

Kouga later heads to Akaza's shop for help to find Karma, but the priests have no clue in finding her. Even if they did find her, there was still the matter entering into her mirror dimension to slay her. To enter her realm, you must either commit suicide or use the Demon Sword of Rubis, which Akaza has. Kouga decided to leave the sword behind and observe Rekka in training. Kouga noticed Rekka's defensive stances need work and it triggered her to attack him; Kouga defeated her to prove her limitations.

At night, Kouga traveled around the city before Zaruba senses Shion as she was about to deliver Karma another victim. Shion was made and she discards the woman to escape Kouga. Tracking Shion to Crime, Kouga and Zaruba found a barrier erected around the club. As soon as Kouga found the barrier talisman and destroyed it, Rekka appears and confirms that someone betrayed them as the barrier is the work of a priest.

Once inside, Kouga finds Shion luring Rekka to Karma using the image of Rekka's father. Before Rekka could fall for the Horror's trick, Kouga shatters the mirror; Karma enters a round mirror as Shion spirits it away with Rekka in pursuit. Kouga battled with Kurusu, who enabled Karma to forcefully control some of the patrons into fighting Kouga and Rekka. As Rekka knocks the possessed humans unconscious, Kouga cracks the mirror to break Karma's hold on the humans. With no one left to hold their enemies off, Kurusu assumes his true Horror form to overpower Kouga and Rekka. When Kouga attempts to bring his armor, Shion had the Garo armor sent into Karma's mirror world. Without Garo, Kouga couldn't stop Kurusu from harming Rekka. However, Akaza and Shiguto arrived with an army of shikigami ninja to drive the Horrors off. After the battle, Rekka finds out Akaza was the traitor and wanted to hurt him; Kouga intervened to prevent her from harming him.

At the shop, Kouga recovers from his injuries. Rekka felt deeply guilty and self-loathed what she has become; Kouga explains by keeping her alive, many others will be saved by her hands some day. Kouga finds Akaza and learns that Karma exploited the priest's desire to see his dead wife and daughter; he was given a mirror that allows him to see his loved ones once again, in return for concealing her. Although he knew that was only an illusion, he could not bring himself to toss away the mirror and intends to accept the consequences of his actions. Taking the Rubis Sword from Akaza to prevent him from going on a suicide mission, Kouga intends to regain his armor.

Eventually, the team finds Karma's new location, but they aren't aware it's a trap. Akaza joins the team to help them defeat Karma. After sealing the building to prevent evil to escape, Kouga and the others search for Karma while dealing with numerous phantoms created from her many victims. As Kouga fights for his life against Kurusu, Rekka kills Shion before finding Karma's mirror and alerting the others to her location.

At mirror location, Rekka and Kouga fought Kurusu. Rekka activated the Rubis Sword to enter Karma's mirror world and the three of them took their battle within Karma's mirror. Able to summon his armor within Karma's realm, Garo returned and defeated Kurusu. However, Karma appeared and reconfigured the stage into a hellish wasteland for combat. Battling in her true form, Garo struggles to defeat Karma. However, Akaza sacrifices his life to cross into the mirror to deliver Rekka's flute. By playing the flute, she was able to summon all the trapped spirits (including her father) Karma has been feeding on. They united their power and formed Dragon Formation Garo to defeat Karma. Returning to their world, Kouga and Rekka learned that Akaza sacrificed himself to save them. Heartbroken over Akaza's death, the team mourns for Akaza.

With Karma defeated, Kouga bids Rekka and Shiguto farewell. Rekka intends to stay behind to watch over the city with Shiguto. Before leaving, Rekka gives Kouga a young Demon World Dragon if either needs to contact the other for help. On their way back to their territory, thinking up a name for the young Demon World Dragon, Zaruba decides to call it "Kaoru", much to Kouga's annoyance. Kouga's story continues in Garo: Makai Senki.

== Cast ==
- Ryosei Konishi as Kouga Saejima
- Mary Matsuyama as Rekka
- Masahiro Kuranuki as Shiguto
- Yôsuke Saitô as Akaza
- Shinji Kasahara as Kurusu
- Hiromi Eguchi as Shion
- Saori Hara as Karma
- Kanji Tsuda as Kengi
- Akira Nakao as Kenichi Kurusu
- Ryusei Sawahata as 12-year-old Kouga
- Aya Kumeta as the woman pushing a baby carriage
- Sachiko Katsumata as Akaza's wife
- Mai Inohana as Akaza's daughter
- Ami Tokito as Ami
- Yuko Sakurai as Miki
- Tomoka Imai as Rina
- Reika Shigehiro as Ruka
- Kumi as Aya
- Rie Shimizu as The woman as a model
- Sato Higashi, Haruka Goto, Manami Nishiyama as the women at a club
- Fumito Moriwaki, Giry Vincent as the men at a club
- Rin Ibuki as the white-painted woman
- Ririne Sasano as Warashi
- Hironobu Kageyama as Madou Ring Zaruba (voice)
- Mika Hijii as Karma (voice)

== Release ==
Garo: Red Requiem was released in Japan on October 30, 2010.
