= Yukijirō Hotaru =

Japanese actor

- Born: August 27, 1951 (age 74); Saitama, Japan
- Occupation: Actor
- Years active: 1970–present

Yukijirō Hotaru (螢雪次朗, Hotaru Yukijirō) is a Japanese actor. He is best known for the role of Gonza Kurahashi in the Garo television franchise.

He has played Tsutomu Osako, a recurring role in the Heisei Gamera trilogy, along with the 2003 independent film GAMERA 4-TRUTH (jp), which was permitted by Tokuma Shoten under the condition to be free of charge. His decision to play the character for the Gamera films was prompted by Yukitarō Hotaru's involvement in the 1967 film Gamera vs. Gyaos.

== Filmography ==
=== Film ===
- Sexy Battle Girls (1986)
- Time Adventure: Zeccho 5-byo Mae (1986)
- Itoshino Half Moon (1987)
- Ogenki kurinikku: Tatte moraimasu aka Welcome to the Ogenki Clinic (1988)
- Subway Serial Rape: Lover Hunting (1988)
- Zeiram (1991)
- Aiyoku Shūdōin: Jukujo, Chijo, Seijo (1995)
- Gamera: Guardian of the Universe (1995)
- Mechanical Violator Hakaider (1995)
- The Bondage Master (1996)
- Jukujo no Sasoijiru: Nanbon de Mohoshii (1997)
- Onna chikan sôsakan: Oshiri de shôbu! aka Sexy S.W.A.T. Team (1998)
- Gamera 3: Revenge of Iris (1999)
- Tekkōki Mikazuki (2000)
- Pyrokinesis (2000)
- Mourning Wife (2001)
- Porisu (2001)
- Stacy (2001)
- Godzilla, Mothra and King Ghidorah: Giant Monsters All-Out Attack (2001)
- Molester's Bus 2: Heat of the Over Thirty (2002)
- The Glamorous Life of Sachiko Hanai (2003)
- Ashurajō no Hitomi (2005)
- Deep Sea Monster Reigo (2005)
- The Inugamis (2006)
- Garo Special: Byakuya no Maju (2006)
- The iDol (2006)
- A Tale of Mari and Three Puppies (2007)
- Wandering Home (2010)
- Garo: Makai no Hana (2014)
- The Little House (2014)
- 125 Years Memory (2015)
- Garo: Makai Retsuden (2016)
- Somebody's Xylophone (2016)
- Sakura Guardian in the North (2018)
- The Great Buddha Arrival (2018)
- Restart After Come Back Home (2020)
- Nezura 1964 (2021), Nagano
- Inubu: The Dog Club (2021)
- Nobutora (2021)
- Goodbye Cruel World (2022)
- Sin Clock (2023)

=== Television ===
- La Belle Fille Masquée Poitrine (TV series, 1990)
- Ultraman Max (TV series, 2005–2006)
- Garo (TV series, 2005–2006)
- Tenchijin (TV series, 2009)
- Garo: Makai Senki (TV series, 2011/2012)
- Shōgun (TV miniseries, 2024)
- Ultraman Omega (TV series, 2025)
