= Garo: Soukoku no Maryu =

Japanese name
- Kanji: 牙狼〈GARO〉～蒼哭ノ魔竜～
Transcriptions
- Revised Hepburn: Garo ~Sōkoku no Maryū~
- Directed by: Keita Amemiya
- Written by: Keita Amemiya
- Produced by: Natsui Kanako; Hirofumi Yamabe; Hiyoshi Mamada
- Starring: Ryosei Konishi; Yuki Kubota; Anna Aoi; Keiko Matsuzaka
- Cinematography: Akira Nishioka
- Edited by: Tomoki Nagasaka
- Music by: Shunji Inoue
- Production company: Tohokushinsha Film
- Distributed by: Tohokushinsha Film
- Release date: February 23, 2013
- Running time: 96 minutes
- Country: Japan
- Language: Japanese

Garo: Soukoku no Maryu (牙狼〈GARO〉～蒼哭ノ魔竜～, Garo Sōkoku no Maryū; lit "Demon Dragon of the Blue Cries") is a Japanese superhero film that released on February 23, 2013, and serves as an epilogue to Garo: Makai Senki. Ryosei Konishi was initially the only confirmed member of the cast, but Ray Fujita, Shouma Yamamoto, Ozuno Nakamura, Yukijirō Hotaru, Hironobu Kageyama, and Hiroyuki Watanabe were later confirmed to appear in the film. The guest stars in the film are Yuki Kubota, Anna Aoi, Tetsuya Yanagihara, and Keiko Matsuzaka. The catchphrase for the movie is "Save the Object World" (モノたちの世界を守れ, Mono-tachi no Sekai o Mamore).

== Plot ==
After the events of Makai Flash Knight, Kouga Saejima appears before Gajari to honor the pact he forged in order to stop Sigma Fudō from killing all the Makai Knights. Kouga is given the task to travel to the Promised Land (約束の地, Yakusoku no Chi) to retrieve a part of Gajari: the Fang of Sorrow (嘆きの牙, Nageki no Kiba). However, upon his arrival into the Forest of Chaos (混沌の森, Konton no Mori), Kouga finds himself without his coat and Zaruba nowhere to be seen before seeing the Garouken turned into the Red Dog (赤ノ犬, Aka no Inu) before running off. Confronting a group of tin knights called Swordmen of the Wind (風の剣士, Kaze no Kenshi) escorting a picture frame, Kouga obtains a sword when they are attacked by a formless monster, a Nanashi (ナナシ). Once the two surviving knights run off, Kouga sees a blue skinned girl emerging from the picture frame. The girl introduces herself as Meru and that she is like every resident in the Promised Land: A living object. Meru proceeds to explain that she was captured to be taken to Green Castle (緑ノ城, Midori no Shiro) as an offering to Queen Judam. Despite being warned of the danger, Kouga is guided to the Temple of Wisdom (知恵の祠, Chie no Hokora) by Meru to find out where to find the Fang of Sorrow.

Once there, Kouga encounters a fading scarecrow-like entity that transforms into a human-like form when he unintentionally named him "Kakashi". After Kakashi takes his leave, learning that he is in the Hill of Nothingness (虚空の丘, Kokū no Oka) graveyard of those who lost their names and forms, Kouga and Meru are forced to run from the Nanashi reacting to the event. Once at the shrine, Kouga finds that its Guardian of Wisdom (知恵ノ番人, Chie no Ban'nin) is Zaruba who has no memory of Kouga and assumes a large form to reflect Kouga's imagination to have the human fight him for what he wants to know. Eventually, Zaruba remembers Kouga and revert to original form. Zaruba proceeds to reveal that Kouga's arrival has caused a time dilation and that he has served as the guardian for centuries before being reunited. Before anything else can be settled, Kouga calls out the mysterious gnome-like object that has been following them. Introducing himself as Kiria from the Land of Bliss (至福の大地, Shifuku no Daichi), he pleas Kouga for his help. Learning about the Maryu, a dark dragon that creates nothingness in its path and would emerge once the moon is completely black, Kouga and the others come to the suspected conclusion that the monster's fang is also the Fang of Sorrow. However, Kouge feels that finding his items should be his first priority before defeating the Maryu.

Once at the Land of Bliss, finding himself dancing with Meru, Kouga encounters Kakashi who provokes him into a duel before the harpy-like White Bird (白ノ鳥, Shiro no Tori) appears. Revealed to be Kouga's coat, the harpy flies off with Kouga in pursuit while Kakashi follows after him. However, the three are captured by the Green Castle with Kouga meeting Judam and voicing his opinions on her heartless behavior for what she considers ugly and lustful greed for beautiful things. By then, thanks to Kakashi's trusted canine companion Kuromaru steering their Halloween-ish Blue Palace (青ノ館, Ao no Yakata) house into the Green Castle, Kouga frees his coat and Kakashi so they can escape. After learning he needs the Garouken for his coat to recognize him, Kouga learns of Kakashi's plans to merge with the Maryu to become human. However, Judam took the Maryu scale needed for the fusion. But upon learning Kouga intends to kill the Maryu, Kakashi decides to finish their duel when Kiria arrives. Unfortunately, Kouga and Kiria find the Land of Bliss in ruins with the former helping the latter remember his best friend Raudo after he died. The two then find another survivor named Daruki, who reveals that Judam took Meru as an offering to the Maryu.

At the Seas of Lamentation (嘆きの海, Nageki no Umi), before dangling her above the vortex the Maryu is to emerge from, Judam reveals to a humanized Meru her intention to exact revenge on humans even if she must sacrifice her only beauty by merging with the Maryu to do so. However, as Kakashi makes an attempt to reclaim the scale in a battle between his house and Judam's castle, Kiria saves Meru while Kouga sees the Garouken and reclaims the weapon. Seeing a ghost of Taiga appearing before him while regaining his coat, Kouga arrives to save Kakashi after his house is destroyed before making his way to the Green Castle to face Judam. Seeing her memory wiping against the human, Judam battles Kouga as she reveals that she will merge with the Maryu to enter the human world and destroy humanity for discarding her into the Promised Land. Kouga attempts to reason with Judam, but she refuses to listen as she uses the Maryu's scale transform into a small dragon. Despite its size, the Maryu quickly creates a giant mechanical construct around itself.

Donning Garo, Kouga chases after the Maryu as it attempts to transverse into the human world with his friends helping out. However, once in the space between dimensions, the Maryu is about to kill Garo with its Black Wind (黒き風, Kuroki Kaze) when Kakashi arrives the Makai Knight the energies within his heart. Riding a version of Goten, Blue Dragon Garo destroys the Maryu's construct to run Judam through. As Judam accepts Kouga's apology for humanity's discarding nature, the Maryuu dissolves with only a fang from its construct body remaining. Back in the Promised Land, Kouga finds Kakashi dying from his self sacrifices and learns that he was a training dummy Kouga sparred with as a child. After Kouga tells him that he was one of many who made him, Kakashi fades away with Kuromaru crying over his friend's departure. Once he arrives with Meru, revealed to be a pen in the human world, Kiria fades once his owner finds him alongside Kuromaru, who is a stuffed animal.

Destroying the Maryu's fang to Meru and Zaruba's shock, Kouga explains that he himself is the actual Fang of Sorrow. Meru is confused and Kouga explains to her that Gajari was a product of the Makai Knights' imagination and that the whole quest was for Kouga to understand the symbiosis of the dreamers and the dream. Gajari appears and congratulates Kouga for reaching that conclusion before transforming into a portal to send Kouga back to his world. Before he leaves, Kouga tells Meru that he knew the entire she was Rekka's dragonfish Kaoru as she returns to her true form to accompany Kouga. While visiting the remnants of Kakashi's true form, learning of a competition among the Makai Knights in his absence where the winner can visit one who is deceased, Kouga challenges the winner Rei to a duel with his father helping his opponent in spirit. Some time after, Kaoru at the park in the aftermath of her book's successful launch when she is reunited with Kouga. The story sets apart two different journeys from here. Kouga would continue his story in the mini-series Saejima Kouga and later Garo: Gekkou no Tabibito. Kouga's son (Raiga) would start his journey as Garo in Garo: Makai no Hana and would join his father in Garo: Gekkou no Tabibito.

== Cast ==
- Kouga Saejima (冴島 鋼牙, Saejima Kōga): Ryosei Konishi (小西 遼生, Konishi Ryōsei)
- Kakashi (カカシ): Yuki Kubota (久保田 悠来, Kubota Yūki)
- Meru (メル): Anna Aoi (蒼 あんな, Aoi Anna)
- Judam (ジュダム, Judamu): Keiko Matsuzaka (松坂 慶子, Matsuzaka Keiko)
- Kaoru Mitsuki (御月 カオル, Mitsuki Kaoru): Mika Hijii (肘井 美佳, Hijii Mika)
- Rei Suzumura (涼邑 零, Suzumura Rei): Ray Fujita (藤田 玲, Fujita Rei)
- Tsubasa Yamagatana (山刀 翼, Yamagatana Tsubasa): Shouma Yamamoto (山本 匠馬, Yamamoto Shōma)
- Leo Fudō (布道 レオ, Fudō Reo): Ozuno Nakamura (中村 織央, Nakamura Ozuno)
- Taiga Saejima (冴島 大河, Saejima Taiga): Hiroyuki Watanabe (渡辺 裕之, Watanabe Hiroyuki)
- Madō Ring Zaruba (魔導輪ザルバ, Madōrin Zaruba; Voice): Hironobu Kageyama (影山 ヒロノブ, Kageyama Hironobu)
- Madō Necklace Silva (魔導具シルヴァ, Madōgu Shiruva; Voice): Ai Orikasa (折笠 愛, Orikasa Ai)
- Gajari (ガジャリ; Voice): Ryūzaburō Ōtomo (大友 龍三郎, Ōtomo Ryūzaburō)
- Kiria (キリア; Voice): Yukijirō Hotaru (螢 雪次朗, Hotaru Yukijirō)
- Esaruto (エサルト; Voice): Tetsuya Yanagihara (柳原 哲也, Yanagihara Tetsuya)
- Kuromaru (クロマル; Voice), Raudo (ラウド; Voice): Yukari Okuda (奥田 ゆかり, Okuda Yukari)

== Theme song ==
- "Kaze ~Tabidachi no Uta~" (風～旅立ちの詩～; "Wind ~The Traveler's Song~")
  - Lyrics & Composition: Hironobu Kageyama
  - Arrangement: Yoshichika Kuriyama, Shiho Terada
  - Artist: JAM Project
