= Ray Fujita =

Japanese actor and musician

- 藤田 玲
- Born: September 6, 1988 (age 38); Nakano, Tokyo, Japan
- Other name: Ray Fujita
- Occupations: Actor, Musician
- Years active: 2003–present
- Notable credits: Kamen Rider 555 as Kitazaki/Dragon Orphnoch, GARO as Rei Suzumura
- Website: www.fujitaray.com

Ray Fujita (藤田 玲, Fujita Rei; born September 6, 1988), is a Japanese-French actor and musician from Tokyo. His mother is Japanese and his father is French. His most notable roles to date are as Kitazaki/Dragon Orphnoch in the 2003 series Kamen Rider 555 and Rei Suzumura/ZERO the Silver Fanged Knight in the 2006 series GARO. He is also the lead vocalist of the band Dustz.

== Filmography ==
=== Television ===
- Kamen Rider 555 (2003–2004) – Kitazaki/Dragon Orphnoch; (Kamen Rider Delta)
- Ougon Kishi GARO (2005–2006) – Rei Suzumura/Silver Fanged Knight ZERO
- Princess Princess D (2006) – Yūjirō Shihōdani
- Garo Special: Byakuya no Maju (2006) – Rei Suzumura/Silver Fanged Knight ZERO
- Senjou no Girls Life (2007) – Takuto
- Fuuma no Kojirou (2007) – Kousuke Mibu
- RH Plus (2008) – Haruka Konoe
- Garo: Makai Senki (2011) – Rei Suzumura/Silver Fanged Knight ZERO
- Zero: Black Blood (2014) – Rei Suzumura/Silver Fanged Knight ZERO
- Zero: Dragon Blood (2017) – Rei Suzumura/Silver Fanged Knight ZERO
- Super Space Sheriff Gavan Infinity (2026) - Tesshin Mikage/Death Gavan
- Kakusei Hunter Omegahorn (2026) - Tesshin Mikage/Death Gavan

=== Cinema ===
- Akogare no Hito (2004) – Satoshi
- Itoshii Koto Dekinai (2007) – Shin (Visual Boy)
- Crazy Crown (2007) – Ranmaru Mori
- Arakure Knight (2007) – Igeki
- Hard Revenge, Milly: Bloody Battle (2009)
- Maebashi Visual-Kei (2011)
- Borderline (2017) - Aberu Wagatsuma
- Double Drive: Ookami no Okite (2018) - Aberu Wagatsuma
- Double Drive: Ryuu no Kizuna (2018) - Aberu Wagatsuma
- Mt. Fuji and Happiness Code (2025)

== Music ==
Fujita is the lead vocalist of the band Dustz, under the pseudonym Takuto. He has also released in-character CD singles and participated in band projects with co-stars, such as GARO Project, as part of his acting roles.

Release date	Title	Artist
July 2006	"I Will Continue to Show You My Love" (僕が愛を伝えてゆく, Boku ga Ai o Tsutaeteyuku)	GARO Project (Ray Fujita with Ryōsei Konishi, Mika Hijii, Masaki Kyomoto and Hiroyuki Watanabe)
August 2006	"Princess Princess D Character Song Series Vol.1 Treasure" (プリンセス・プリンセスD キャラクターソングシリーズ Vol.1 Treasure, Purinsesu Purinsesu Dī Kyarakutā Songu Shirīzu Vol.1 Treasure)	Hime (Ray Fujita with Kenta Kamakari and Takeru Satoh)
October 2006	"G-Kyuu" (G-九, Jī Kyū)	Dustz
November 2006	"Red Rose" (赤いバラ, Akai Bara)	GARO Project
November 2006	"Princess Princess D Character Song Series Vol.4 Raindrops ~Yūjirō's Theme~" (プリンセス・プリンセスD キャラクターソングシリーズ Vol.4 Raindrops ～裕史郎のテーマ～, Purinsesu Purinsesu Dī Kyarakutā Songu Shirīzu Vol.4 Raindrops ~Yujirō no Tēma~)	Ray Fujita as Yūjirō Shihōdani
January 2007	"Girls' Life Battlefield" (戦場のガールズライフ, Senjō no Gāruzu Raifu)	Dustz
March 2008	"Future"	Dustz
May 2009	"Break & Peace"	Dustz
October 2011	"Brilliant Day"	Dustz
April 2011	"Criez"	Dustz
August 2011	"Spiral"	Dustz
December 2011	"TROIS"	Dustz

== Other media ==
Photobooks

- Princess Princess D Making Book (プリンセス・プリンセスD Making Book) (August 2006, ISBN 4-403-65027-9)
- Official Photo Album Princess Princess D (Official Photo Album プリンセス・プリンセスD) (October 2006, ISBN 4-403-65028-7)
- Fujita Ray x Herbie Yamaguchi [Une Journée] (藤田玲Xハービー山口「Une Journee」) (January 2007)
- Ambitious First Edition (Ambitious アンビシャス 創刊準備号) (March 2007)

Stage plays and musicals

- Jujutsu Kaisen 0 Tokyo Toritsu Jujutsu Kōtō Senmon Gakkō (2024-2025) – Suguru Geto
- Jujutsu Kaisen Kaigyoku/Tamaori (2025) – Suguru Geto

Video Games

- Black Star Theater Starless (2019) - Kei (Singing Voice only)
