= Garo Special: Beast of the Demon Night =

- Japanese DVD cover
- Genre: Tokusatsu
- Created by: Keita Amemiya
- Written by: Itaru Era
- Directed by: Keita Amemiya
- Starring: Hiroki Konishi; Mika Hijii; Ray Fujita; Shouma Yamamoto
- Country of origin: Japan
- Original language: Japanese
- No. of episodes: 2

Production
- Executive producers: Minoru Kubo; Kiyotaka Ninomiya
- Producers: Miyuki Udagawa; Kanano Natsui; Chizuko Kanno
- Running time: 50 minutes (per episode)

Original release
- Network: Family Gekijo
- Release: December 15 – December 22, 2006

Related
- GARO; Garo: Makai Senki

Garo Special: Beast of the Demon Night (牙狼〈GARO〉スペシャル 白夜の魔獣, GARO Supesharu Byakuya no Majū, subtitle literally "Demon Beast of the Midnight Sun") is a two-part made-for-TV movie of the Japanese tokusatsu series Garo that aired at the end of 2006. Like the original series, it was licensed to the United States by Section23 Films.

== Plot ==
Set after the events Chapter of the Black Wolf, young Makai Priestess Rin sends a message to Kouga after using herself as Horror bait to get his attention. While at home, they discuss the matter and suspects the validity of the message since it comes from deceased Priest Amon. She tries to show her magical skills as a means of proof, but only damaged Kouga's favorite painting from Kaoru. Kouga was upset, but went through with the summoning ritual to speak with Amon. Priest Amon's spirit informs Kouga that Jabi is alive and she resides within Makai Tree Miki.

In another district, Rei encounters a strange Horror and kills him as Zero. In the aftermath, he was assigned to Kantai to assist the ritual of midnight sun to ensure nothing goes wrong. Kouga and Rin enters Kantai to cross through the Makai Forrest. As he entered, Kouga was involved in an altercation between Tsubasa and his two disciples.

Tsubasa (Rin's older brother and knight), was critical of Kouga's intentions and scolds his little sister Rin for getting involved in the matter, but Priestess Garai permitted entrance. As Kouga enters the Makai realm to save Jabi from the Miki, Rin must keep the portal open or Kouga will be lost forever. Meanwhile, Tsubasa's disciples are attacked by Karakuris and were outmatched when Rei comes to save them. Tsubasa appears and becomes Dan the Midnight Sun Knight to dispose of the remaining threat. As Kouga defeats Miki's obstacles, Kouga faces the beast's ultimate form and forces Kouga to transform into Garo. Kouga eventually awakens Jabi from her slumber and slays Miki with the double-sized Garou Zanbaken sword. Kouga brought Jabi back to the living and thanked Rin for helping. Rin kept the pathway open despite how frightening the situation was and Kouga thanked Rin for her courage. Around the same time, a mysterious creature named Legules begun converting Horrors into his Karakuri minions as he makes his way to Kantai, killing hundreds of humans along the way.

After Jabi was rescued, she trains Rin in her magical skills. Priestess Garai reflects her memories over the Saejima family happily together before the couple's death and orphaning Kouga. The Order informs Kouga of Legules, a Horror of great power, and prepares for a counter-offensive with everyone for the fiend's arrival. Garai explains that the Midnight Sun ritual is meant to keep the world whole by shooting the Phosphorus Arrow into the eclipse portal, but if the process was stained with innocent blood then the ritual will be a dark one that would revive Legules' legion.

Tsubasa was not pleased to know Jabi was brought back to life, claiming her to be undead. Jabi forces Tsubasa to feel her breast for a heartbeat and also breath to make him understand she's very much alive. After that argument was settled, they went to examine the Phosphorus Arrow in preparation for the Midnight Sun ritual that Legules has come to ruin. Jabi discovers the reason why she was brought back to the world of the living - the arrow's power has diminished over time and needs to be replenished. In between that time Rei, Kouga, and Tsubasa guards Kantai until the ritual starts. During nightfall, Legules launched a failed attack on the group. The arrow has been recharged but Rin was injured during battle and infected with horror's blood. Jabi opted to use a risky purification technique to save her, though the process proved to be painful, it worked nonetheless. Unknown to the group, he left part of himself inside Goruba (Tsubasa's Madōgu bracelet) and patiently waited for his chance to strike.

After Tsubasa apologizes to Jabi and made up with Rin, Legules appeared. He took the arrow and kidnapped Rin. The group entered the Naraku Forrest to save Rin and prevent the arrow be tainted with innocent blood. As everyone fought their way through, Kouga faced Legules with the assistance of Jabi. The duo was losing, and to make matters worse, Legules taken a powerful demon beast form. Kouga donned his armor and was caught in Legules's attack when Kouga used the Phosphorus Arrow to purify his body and became Phosphorus Garo. The arrow transformed into a spear and Garo throws the arrow into the eclipse for sealing, killing Legules along the way, completing the Midnight Sun ritual at the same time. With Legules's death, his minions were gone and Kantai was restored to peace. In the aftermath, Jabi stays in Kantai to look after Rin and Rei heads back to his district post. The adventure ends with Kouga returning home to find Kaoru waiting for him in the yard after restoring the damaged painting. The story continues with Kouga in Red Requiem.

== Cast ==
- Kouga Saejima (冴島 鋼牙, Saejima Kōga): Hiroki Konishi (小西 大樹, Konishi Hiroki)
- Rei Suzumura (涼邑 零, Suzumura Rei): Ray Fujita (藤田 玲, Fujita Rei)
- Tsubasa Yamagatana (山刀 翼, Yamagatana Tsubasa): Shouma Yamamoto (山本 匠馬, Yamamoto Shōma)
- Rin Yamagatana (山刀 鈴, Yamagatana Rin): Yuzumi Shibamoto (柴本 優澄美, Shibamoto Yuzumi)
- Gonza Kurahashi (倉橋 ゴンザ, Kurahashi Gonza): Yukijiro Hotaru (螢 雪次朗, Hotaru Yukijirō)
- Kaoru Mitsuki (御月 カオル, Mitsuki Kaoru): Mika Hijii (肘井 美佳, Hijii Mika)
- Hyuga (日向, Hyūga): Minoru Tomita (富田 稔, Tomita Minoru)
- Akatsuki (暁): Noboru Yasunaga (安永 昇, Yasunaga Noboru)
- Ouka (黄花, Ōka): ANN
- Manju (満寿): Saori (沙織)
- Priest of the Eastern Watchdog: Toshiki Ayata (綾田 俊樹, Ayata Toshiki)
- Young Kouga: Ryusei Sawahata (澤畠 流星, Sawahata Ryūsei)
- Young Jabi: Mizuho Kaneo (兼尾 瑞穂, Kaneo Mizuho)
- 2-year-old Kouga: Shuhei Jojo (城定 修平, Jōjō Shūhei)
- Kodama (コダマ): Mark Musashi (マーク武蔵, Māku Musashi)
- Jabi (邪美): Yasue Sato (佐藤 康恵, Satō Yasue)
- Priestess Garai (我雷法師, Garai-hōshi): Kazue Tsunogae (角替 和枝, Tsunogae Kazue)
- Priest Amon (阿門法師, Amon-hōshi): Akaji Maro (麿 赤児, Maro Akaji)
- Rin Saejima (冴島 りん, Saejima Rin): Junko Tashiro (田代 純子, Tashiro Junko)
- Taiga Saejima (冴島 大河, Saejima Taiga): Hiroyuki Watanabe (渡辺 裕之, Watanabe Hiroyuki)
- Barago (バラゴ): Masaki Kyomoto (京本 政樹, Kyōmoto Masaki)
- Madō Ring Zaruba (魔導輪ザルバ, Madōrin Zaruba, Voice): Hironobu Kageyama (影山 ヒロノブ, Kageyama Hironobu)
- Madō Necklace Silva (魔導具シルヴァ, Madōgu Shiruva, Voice): Ai Orikasa (折笠 愛, Orikasa Ai)
- Madō Bracelet Goruba (魔導具ゴルバ, Madōgu Goruba, Voice): Kenichi Ogata (緒方 賢一, Ogata Ken'ichi)
- Makai Tree (魔戒樹, Makaiju, Voice): Yukari Okuda (奥田 ゆかり, Okuda Yukari)
- Aomushi (アオムシ, Voice): Keiichiro Satomi (里見 圭一郎, Satomi Keiichirō)
- Legules (レギュレイス, Regyureisu, Voice): Hirose Masashi (広瀬 正志, Hirose Masashi)

== Theme songs ==
Opening theme

- "Theme of GARO"
  - Music by TRYFORCE and JAM Project

Ending theme

- "Aurora no Shita de" (オーロラの下で, Ōrora no Shita de, "Under the Aurora")
  - Lyrics & Composition: Masaki Kyomoto
  - Arrangement: Harukichi Yamamoto
  - Artist: GARO Project
