= Garo: Makai Senki =

Japanese tokusatsu TV series in the Garo franchise

- Promotional poster
- Genre: Tokusatsu; Horror; Drama
- Created by: Keita Amemiya
- Written by: Itaru Era; Keita Amemiya; Kei Taguchi; Makoto Yokoyama; Toshiki Inoue; Yasuko Kobayashi; Hisako Fujihira; Yuji Kobayashi
- Directed by: Keita Amemiya; Makoto Yokoyama; Ryu Kaneda; Ichijun Kosaka
- Starring: Ryosei Konishi; Mika Hijii; Ozuno Nakamura; Ray Fujita; Shouma Yamamoto
- Voices of: Hironobu Kageyama; Ai Orikasa
- Narrated by: Hironobu Kageyama
- Opening theme: "GARO -MAKAI SENKI- with JAM Project"; "Waga Na wa Garo" by JAM Project
- Ending theme: "Predestination" by JAM Project feat. Masami Okui; "PROMISE ~Without you~" by JAM Project feat. Masami Okui
- Composer: Shunji Inoue
- Country of origin: Japan
- Original language: Japanese
- No. of episodes: 25 (list of episodes)

Production
- Executive producer: Kiyotaka Ninomiya
- Producers: Ryo Okimoto; Kanako Natsui; Ichiro Higa

Original release
- Network: TV Tokyo
- Release: October 6, 2011 – March 22, 2012

Related
- Garo Special: Beast of the Demon Night; Garo: Yami o Terasu Mono; GARO

Garo: Makai Senki (牙狼〈GARO〉～MAKAISENKI～; (Note: "Makai Senki" is written as "魔戒閃騎" in kanji, which translates to "Makai Flash Knight".)) is a Japanese tokusatsu television series serving as a sequel to Garo, airing on TV Tokyo between October 6, 2011, and March 22, 2012. The catchphrase for the series is "The knight's oath, shines in gold" (騎士の誓い、金色に輝け。, Kishi no Chikai, Konjiki ni Kagayake.).

Ryosei Konishi, Mika Hijii, Ray Fujita, Yasue Sato, Hironobu Kageyama, Ai Orikasa, and Yukijirō Hotaru reprise their roles from the original television series. Shouma Yamamoto reprises his role from the Beast of the Demon Night special. Mary Matsuyama and Masahiro Kuranuki reprise their roles from the Red Requiem film. Newcomers to the series include Ozuno Nakamura and Yuriko Hishimi.

== Plot ==
=== Prologue ===
Almost 20 years into the past, Gōki Fudō, Flash Knight Lord, trained his twin boys to succeed him as the next knight. Although Sigma was the more talented one, Gōki chose Leo as he felt Sigma didn't have the heart of a protector. Unfortunately, that didn't sit well with Sigma and he forsaken his knighthood. Leo never wanted to succeed as Lord and both brothers decided to restart their careers as Makai Priests. As adults, both dreamed about a solution to solve the Horror threat; both created the Gōryū. It's an advanced magical machine that helps priests defeats Horrors. While Leo made a small combat drone, Sigma had visions to create the ultimate one: Magōryū Idea. The most powerful anti-horror magical tool to ever be designed, Sigma teamed up with Mio (a love interest to both brothers) to search for a means to power Idea. With the help of Mio, Sigma realized Idea's power core needs the remains of a powerful horror and human sacrifices to realize Idea. However, Sigma has killed innocents to experiment on and intend to use Gyanon's corpse to power Idea. Mio tried to stop Sigma, but it led to her death. Leo vowed to stop his brother's mad crusade, but he disappeared. Sigma would later harness Gyanon's energy, to give him great magical powers. Leo would eventually gain prominence with his gōryū and became a priest of the senate, where he was called "The Second Coming of Amon."

=== Story ===
After Chapter of The Black Wolf and Red Requiem, Kouga's deeds as Garo promoted him to become a Senatorial Knight. Answering directly from the Watch Dog Grace, he is partnered with Leo to handle unique and difficult missions. Before answering the Senate's call, Kouga defeated a Horror when a Red Masked priest appeared and magically cursed him with The Mark of Death. Despite his mark, he accepted his promotion and secretly investigated into the matter without informing anyone aside from Leo.

As Kouga carried out his missions, the level of difficulty increased as he gotten weaker from his mark. He later finds out that Rei and the rest of the Makai Knights have all been marked. As they investigated deeper into the mystery (in between sealing Horrors), the knights suspected a Makai Priest(s) as it's clear that the attack was carried out by a magician. Eventually, Rei and Kouga fought Red Mask and unmasked him, surprised to see the face of Leo. Although the order now knows the face of their target, nobody was able to find Leo.

The truth is revealed after Kouga chased Red Mask after he stole the access key to the Madō Train. After Garo survived battling through a massive Horror's Den, Garo still had to face Red Mask and his gōryū. It was when Kouga was at his weakest that Leo arrived, revealing he's Flash Knight Lord. Leo tried to talk to Sigma, but he escaped. At Kouga's home with Zero, Leo explained about his past and his twin brother's mad quest. Although the truth has been revealed, nobody could stop Sigma. He revealed himself through a magical message, giving the knights an ultimatum: they need to forfeit their armor if they want to live.

At the Senate hall, the knights gathered to talk. Some were willing to give up their armor while others felt it's a dishonor, causing internal conflict. Kouga's title as Garo settled the knights down and promised to find a solution. However, this meeting was a trap. Sigma wanted to lure all the knights into a single place and trapped them in an unbreakable barrier. Sigma accelerated the death mark to hasten their deaths. With limited options, Kouga called forth Gajari (a powerful deity that's part of the order) to help transport his body where Sigma is so he could end the madness. Sigma had stolen the train and intends to use the moon's power to increase his powers. Garo managed to slice off Sigma's cursed arm (that made the marks), cancelling everyone's mark and saving all the knights.

The train crashed during the battle and Sigma salvaged the remains of the train and captured Kouga to travel into the Makai Realm. Once they entered the makai world, Sigma transformed the remains of the train and used Kouga's body to form Idea. With the help of Baron, Zero, Lord, Rekka, Jabi, and Kaoru, they managed to free Kouga, but Idea remains active. Garo and the rest of the knights attempt to stop it, but it was too powerful as it can regenerate any destroyed parts. When they invaded the control room, Sigma boasted the might of his creation, but he spoke too soon as his malice awakened Gyanon. The horror absorbed Sigma and took control of Idea. The entire automaton is now the new body of Gyanon. The might of the entire order descended upon Gyanon as the knights fought against Sigma's automatons and the priests prevented Gyanon from entering the human realm. Leo eventually suggested for the priests to give up their brushes, to allow the knights to create a powerful spiritual blast to take down Gyanon. In a coordinated effort, all the knights fired upon Gyanon and Garo finished Gyanon for good.

Despite restoring balance to the world, Sigma is still at large. It was while Kaoru prepared a feast for Kouga that Sigma took her hostage and forced Kouga in a duel to the death. Sigma knows he's dying, but he still had enough energy left for one last fight. Sigma was defeated, but Kouga's home was destroyed. When Gajari helped Garo, he promised to fulfill a favor for Gajari if he helped him and it was time for Garo to honor that deal. With little time, Kouga bid Kaoru and his friends farewell and he entered the Promised Land in search of a part of Gajari's body. Kouga's journey continues in Demon Dragon of the Blue Cries.

== Theatrical releases ==
Throughout the remainder of 2011 and into 2012, the Garo production team showed three-episode blocks of the program before their television premieres at select theaters in Tokyo, Osaka, Aichi Prefecture, Fukuoka Prefecture, and Hokkaido. The release schedule for these (up through episode 24) were:

- Volume 1 (Episodes 1–3): September 24, 2011
- Volume 2 (Episodes 4–6): October 8, 2011
- Volume 3 (Episodes 7–9): October 22, 2011
- Volume 4 (Episodes 10–12): November 5, 2011
- Volume 5 (Episodes 13–15): January 7, 2012
- Volume 6 (Episodes 16–18): January 21, 2012
- Volume 7 (Episodes 19–21): February 4, 2012
- Volume 8 (Episodes 22–24): February 18, 2012

== Soukoku no Maryu ==
Garo: Soukoku no Maryu (牙狼〈GARO〉～蒼哭ノ魔竜～, Garo ~Sōkoku no Maryū~; subtitle literally "Demon Dragon of the Blue Cries") was released in February 2013, and serves as an epilogue to Makai Senki. It tells the story of what happens to Kouga Saejima when he travels to the Promised Ground to retrieve Gajari's body. Ryosei Konishi was initially the only confirmed member of the cast, but Ray Fujita, Shouma Yamamoto, Ozuno Nakamura, Yukijirō Hotaru, Hironobu Kageyama, and Hiroyuki Watanabe have also been confirmed to appear in the film. The guest stars in the film are Yuki Kubota as Kakashi, Anna Aoi as Meru, Tetsuya Yanagihara as Esaruto, and Keiko Matsuzaka as Judam. JAM Project contributes to the soundtrack of the film, performing the song "Kaze ~Tabidachi no Uta~" (風～旅立ちの詩～; "Wind (The Traveler's Song)").

== Cast ==
- Kouga Saejima (冴島 鋼牙, Saejima Kōga): Ryosei Konishi (小西 遼生, Konishi Ryōsei)
- Kaoru Mitsuki (御月 カオル, Mitsuki Kaoru): Mika Hijii (肘井 美佳, Hijii Mika)
- Leo Fudō (布道 レオ, Fudō Reo), Sigma Fudō (布道 シグマ, Fudō Shiguma): Ozuno Nakamura (中村 織央, Nakamura Ozuno)
- Rei Suzumura (涼邑 零, Suzumura Rei): Ray Fujita (藤田 玲, Fujita Rei)
- Tsubasa Yamagatana (山刀 翼, Yamagatana Tsubasa): Shouma Yamamoto (山本 匠馬, Yamamoto Shōma)
- Wataru Shijima (四十万 ワタル, Shijima Wataru): Kenji Matsuda (松田 賢二, Matsuda Kenji)
- Jabi (邪美): Yasue Sato (さとう やすえ, Satō Yasue)
- Rekka (烈花): Mary Matsuyama (松山 メアリ, Matsuyama Meari)
- Shiguto (シグト): Masahiro Kuranuki (倉貫 匡弘, Kuranuki Masahiro)
- Gonza Kurahashi (倉橋 ゴンザ, Kurahashi Gonza): Yukijirō Hotaru (螢 雪次朗, Hotaru Yukijirō)
- Grace (グレス, Guresu): Yuriko Hishimi (ひし美 ゆり子, Hishimi Yuriko)
- Gigi (ギギ): Hiromi Eguchi (江口 ヒロミ, Eguchi Hiromi)
- Madō Ring Zaruba (魔導輪ザルバ, Madōrin Zaruba; Voice): Hironobu Kageyama (影山 ヒロノブ, Kageyama Hironobu)
- Madō Necklace Silva (魔導具シルヴァ, Madōgu Shiruva; Voice), Madō Mirror Uruba (魔導具ウルバ, Madōgu Uruba; Voice), Madō Ring Eruba (魔導輪エルバ, Madōrin Eruba; Voice): Ai Orikasa (折笠 愛, Orikasa Ai)
- Horror (ホラー, Horā; Voice), Heroic Spirit of Garo (英霊牙狼, Eirei Garo; Voice): Rintarō Nishi (西 凛太朗, Nishi Rintarō)

== Episodes ==
No.	Title	Written by	Original release date
1	"Spark"; Transliteration: "Hibana" (Japanese: 火花)	Itaru Era; Keita Amemiya	October 6, 2011
2	"Street Light"; Transliteration: "Gaitō" (Japanese: 街灯)	Itaru Era	October 13, 2011
3	"Wheels"; Transliteration: "Sharin" (Japanese: 車輪)	Kei Taguchi; Makoto Yokoyama	October 20, 2011
4	"Joker"; Transliteration: "Kirifuda" (Japanese: 切札)	Toshiki Inoue	October 27, 2011
5	"Naraka"; Transliteration: "Naraku" (Japanese: 奈落)	Yasuko Kobayashi	November 3, 2011
6	"Letter"; Transliteration: "Tegami" (Japanese: 手紙)	Itaru Era; Keita Amemiya	November 10, 2011
7	"Flash"; Transliteration: "Senkō" (Japanese: 閃光)	Itaru Era; Keita Amemiya	November 17, 2011
8	"Demon Sword"; Transliteration: "Yōtō" (Japanese: 妖刀)	Itaru Era	November 24, 2011
9	"Makeup"; Transliteration: "Keshō" (Japanese: 化粧)	Hisako Fujihira	December 1, 2011
10	"Secret"; Transliteration: "Himitsu" (Japanese: 秘密)	Keita Amemiya	December 8, 2011
11	"Roaring"; Transliteration: "Hōkō" (Japanese: 咆哮)	Keita Amemiya	December 15, 2011
12	"Fruit"; Transliteration: "Kajitsu" (Japanese: 果実)	Kei Taguchi	December 22, 2011
13	"Enduring Water"; Transliteration: "Sensui" (Japanese: 仙水)	Yuji Kobayashi; Kei Taguchi	January 5, 2012
14	"Reunion"; Transliteration: "Saikai" (Japanese: 再会)	Itaru Era	January 12, 2012
15	"Brethren"; Transliteration: "Harakara" (Japanese: 同胞)	Itaru Era	January 19, 2012
16	"Mask"; Transliteration: "Kamen" (Japanese: 仮面)	Itaru Era; Keita Amemiya	January 26, 2012
17	"Red Brush"; Transliteration: "Akafude" (Japanese: 赤筆)	Itaru Era; Keita Amemiya	February 2, 2012
18	"Herd"; Transliteration: "Gunjū" (Japanese: 群獣)	Itaru Era; Keita Amemiya	February 9, 2012
19	"Paradise"; Transliteration: "Rakuen" (Japanese: 楽園)	Itaru Era; Keita Amemiya	February 16, 2012
20	"Train"; Transliteration: "Ressha" (Japanese: 列車)	Itaru Era; Keita Amemiya	February 23, 2012
21	"Stronghold"; Transliteration: "Gajō" (Japanese: 牙城)	Itaru Era; Keita Amemiya	March 1, 2012
22	"Sworn Friends"; Transliteration: "Meiyū" (Japanese: 盟友)	Itaru Era; Keita Amemiya	March 8, 2012
23	"Golden"; Transliteration: "Konjiki" (Japanese: 金色)	Itaru Era; Keita Amemiya	March 15, 2012
24	"Era"; Transliteration: "Jidai" (Japanese: 時代)	Itaru Era; Keita Amemiya	March 22, 2012
25	"Garo Special My Name Is Garo: The History of Kouga Saejima's Battles"; Transliteration: "Garo Supesharu Waga Na wa Garo -Saejima Kōga Tatakai no Kiseki-" (Japanese: 牙狼〈GARO〉スペシャル 我が名は牙狼―冴島鋼牙 戦いの軌跡―)	N/A	March 29, 2012

== Songs ==
Opening themes

1. "GARO -MAKAI SENKI- with JAM Project"
  - Composition: Yoshichika Kuriyama, Shiho Terada
2. "Waga Na wa Garo" (我が名は牙狼; "My Name Is Garo")
  - Lyrics: Hironobu Kageyama
  - Composition: Hironobu Kageyama, Ricardo Cruz
  - Arrangement: Kenichi Sudō
  - Artist: JAM Project

Ending themes

1. "Predestination"
  - Lyrics & Composition: Masami Okui
  - Arrangement: Kyo Takada
  - Artist: JAM Project featuring Masami Okui
2. "PROMISE ~Without you~"
  - Lyrics & Composition: Masami Okui
  - Arrangement: Kenichi Sudō
  - Artist: JAM Project featuring Masami Okui
