= Golden Knight Garo =

2006 video game

- Developer(s): Bitstep
- Publisher(s): Bandai
- Platform(s): PlayStation 2
- Release: JP: April 20, 2006
- Genre(s): Fighting
- Mode(s): Single-player, multiplayer

Golden Knight Garo (黄金騎士牙狼＜GARO＞, Ōgon Kishi GARO) is a PlayStation 2 video game based on the tokusatsu TV show Garo. It was published by Bandai and released in Japan on April 20, 2006.

== Editions ==
Two versions of this game were released.

- Normal Edition
  - contains the game disk, instruction manual, and standard pamphlets.
- Limited Edition
  - in addition to the objects found in the Normal Edition, the Limited Edition came with a green 'Madou Fire' recolor of the metal Zaruba ring from "Equip and the Prop Vol. 1" Garo toy series.

== Gameplay modes ==
- 牙狼 Mode (Garo/Fanged Wolf Mode)
- 暗黒騎士 Mode (Dark Knight Mode)
- Versus Mode
- 五百年に一度の災い Mode (500-Year One Time Disaster Mode)
- Gallery Mode
- Options

== Versus Mode characters ==
- Garo (Kouga)
- Garo (Taiga)
- Lost Soul Beast Garo
- Zero
- Kouga Saejima
- Taiga Saejima
- Rei Suzumura
- Kodama
- Ishutarb
- Lunarken
- Moloch
- Humpty
- Dantarian
- Gargoyle
- Kiba

== Theme songs ==
- "Theme of Garo" by TRYFORCE
