= Ami Tokito =

- 時東 ぁみ
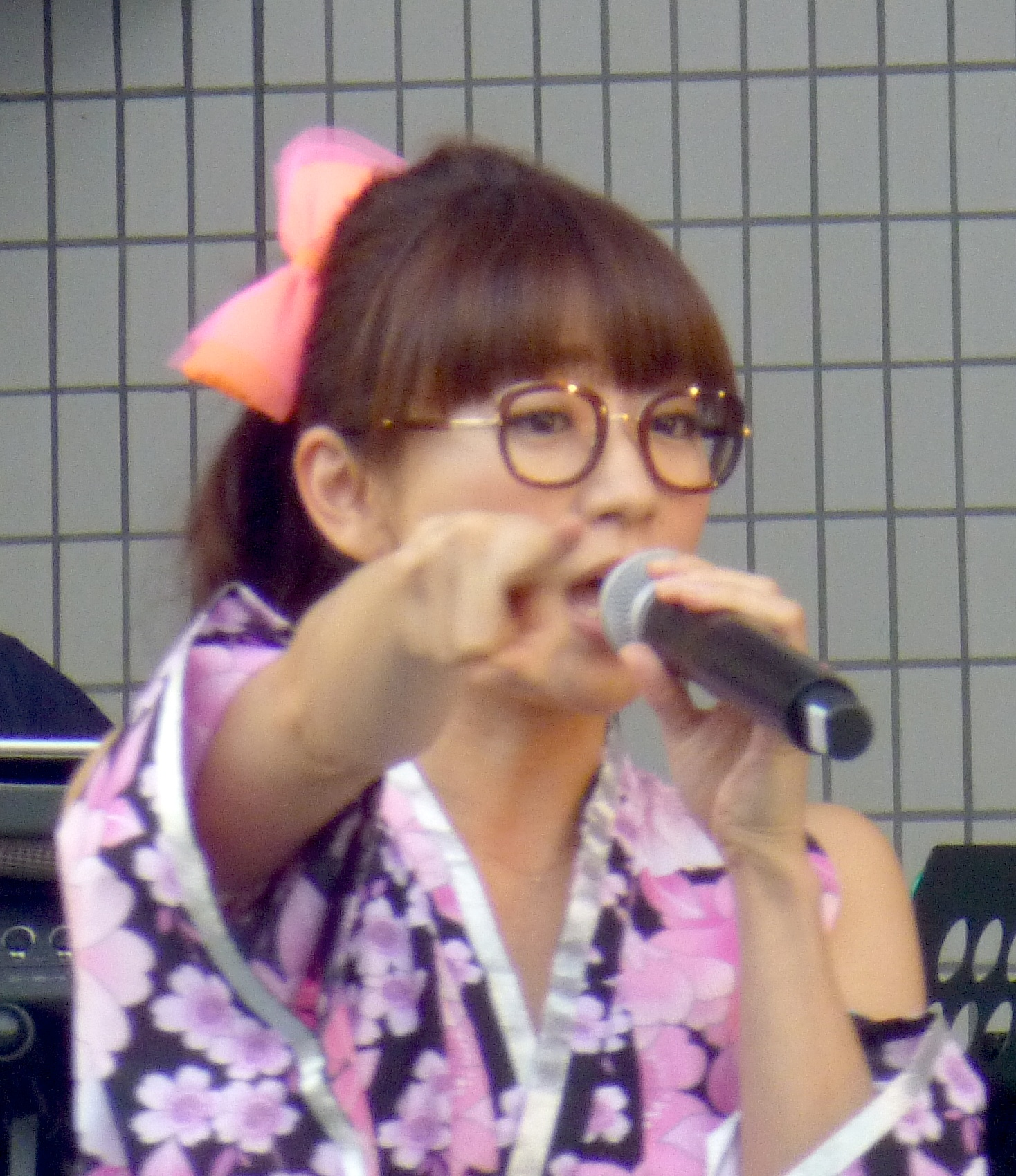
- Tokito at the Vietnam Festival in Yoyogi Park, June 2016
- Born: 25 September 1987 (age 39); Tokyo, Japan
- Occupations: Singer; actress; television personality; gravure idol
- Spouse: DAISHI (m. 2016)
- Children: 1
- Musical career
- Genre: J-pop
- Years active: 2005–present
- Labels: Good Factory Record; TN-mix
- Formerly of: Gyaruru
- Website: ameblo.jp/tokito-ami

Ami Tokito (時東 ぁみ, Tokitō Ami; born 25 September 1987) is a Japanese singer, actress, television personality, and former gravure idol. She debuted in 2005 after winning the Tsunku Award at the Miss Magazine 2005 contest and became known as a prominent "glasses idol" (megadol). She is also a certified Disaster Prevention Specialist (bōsai-shi) who hosts educational events and radio programs on emergency preparedness.

== Career ==
Tokito began her career as a child actress under the name Yukie Komatsu (小松幸江). She later adopted the stage name Ami Tokito (時東あみ), changing the spelling of her given name to use a small hiragana character (時東ぁみ) after winning the Tsunku Award at Miss Magazine 2005.

Under Tsunku's management, Tokito released her debut indie mini-album, ① Sanagi no Bathrobe, on 7 December 2005, followed by a cover mini-album, ② Suki desu..., in March 2006. On 19 April 2006, she made her major-label debut with the single "Sentimental Generation", the opening theme for the anime School Rumble – Second Term, while its B-side "Kono Namida ga Aru Kara Tsugi no Ippo to Naru" was used as the ending theme. She placed second in an Oricon poll on glasses-wearing idols and received an award at the 20th Japan Megane Best Dresser Awards. On the May 2016 variety show Ariyoshi Hanseikai, she recalled turning down requests from senior television personalities to take off her glasses during broadcasts. She has 1.5 vision in both eyes and wears lensless frames on television to avoid studio glare; from 2009 to 2011, she also produced her own eyewear brand, Laue.

In 2006 and 2007, Tokito collaborated with Hello Pro Egg trainees who later formed The Possible. At her 1 April 2006 Nakano Sunplaza concert, Yurika Akiyama, Kanami Morozuka, and Aina Hashimoto performed as her backup dancers. In July 2006, she released the soundtrack single "Sora Kara ~Cry for Help!~" as "Tokito Ami to Deteru Hito" (with Akiyama and Hashimoto) for her starring stage play Cry for Help! ~Uchū Station Chikaku no Baiten nite~. Her February 2007 single, "Aiyai Aiyai!", featured the B-side "Koi no Honey Sweet Angel", which appeared in the Nintendo game Rhythm Tengoku. On 16 May 2007, she released "Tawawa Natsu Bikini", credited to "Tokito Ami with The Possible" (with Kaede Ōse and Kanami Morozuka). Later that year, she joined the Tsunku-produced para-para trio Gyaruru under the nickname "Amimi" alongside Natsuko "Gal" Sone and Asami Abe.

Tokito expanded into voice acting and television dramas in the late 2000s. She made her voice acting debut as Wasabi Toro in the anime Kochira Katsushika-ku Kameari Kōen-mae Hashutsujo, played Mizuki Tsukamoto in the 2008 drama Sumire 16 sai!!, and had her first lead drama role as Yukari Nakayama in Drama Tetsudō Musume ~Girls be ambitious!~ (2008). She later appeared in the films COACH: 40-sai no Figure Skater (2010), Garo: Red Requiem (2010), and Fighting Okan (2011).

In July 2012, Tokito returned to music after a five-year hiatus under the project name "Talking Bunbun", releasing the tatsuo-produced single "Bye Bye to Te o Furu Watashi ni wa Namida no Ato", and performed at the Hoi An Festival in Vietnam the next month. In August and September 2016, her song "Kappa no Namida" aired on NHK's Minna no Uta. She has also served as a Goodwill Bowling Ambassador (2007–2008) and an ambassador for the Vietnam Festa in Kanagawa (2018), while continuing to act in projects such as Shihō Kyōkan Hodaka Yoshiko 3 (2014), the Shura no Otoko to Ienashi Shōjo series (2016–2017), and the 2026 film Henkō Hōdō.

In November 2023, she placed third in the Women's Fitwear Model division at the fitness competition APF Japan Classic 2023.. In 2025, for her 20th debut anniversary, Tokito released the digital singles "Watashi wa Idol" (24 January, produced by 8utterfly) and "Nakimushi" (19 December). She also returned to gravure modeling after a ten-year break, releasing the DVDs 20th aMI on 31 October 2025 and Megane wa Kō de Nakutcha on 24 February 2026.

== Disaster prevention work ==
In high school, Tokito planned to attend a physical education university to become a teacher, basketball referee, or support Paralympic athletes, but gave up college plans due to her schedule after debuting in 2006. At Tsunku's suggestion in 2007, she qualified as a Disaster Prevention Specialist (bōsai-shi). She later earned certifications in advanced first aid, pet disaster risk management, sign language, food sanitation, and unmanned aerial vehicle (drone) operation.

Tokito uses disaster-preparedness songs such as "Papippupei" and "Ok! BOUSAI!" (composed by Pappara Kawai, with an updated music video released on 11 March 2026) in educational activities for children and families. She hosts disaster-preparedness radio programs, including Tokito Ami no Bōsai Radio on ShibuyaCross-FM and the Voicy web series Bōsai aMI-NET, and co-hosts NHK FM's Radio Man Jack. In December 2025, she organized the public disaster-prevention and caregiving event BECK in Tokyo with former gravure colleagues Mayuko Iwasa and Miho Nishida.

== Personal Life ==
On 9 October 2016, Tokito married DAISHI, the lead vocalist of the visual kei rock band Psycho le Cému.. In October 2021, she announced her first pregnancy following four and a half years of fertility treatment. She gave birth to a son in March 2022.

== Discography ==
=== Singles ===
Year	Title	Release date	Label	Notes
2006	"Sentimental Generation" (せんちめんたる じぇねれ〜しょん)	19 April 2006	Marvelous Entertainment	Opening theme for School Rumble – Second Term
2006	"Sora Kara ~Cry for Help!~" (宇宙から〜CRY FOR HELP!〜)	12 July 2006	Good Factory Record	Stage soundtrack single credited to "Tokito Ami to Deteru Hito" (featuring Yurika Akiyama and Aina Hashimoto)
2006	"I'm a lady ~Jirettai Watashi~" (I'm a lady〜じれったい私〜)	1 November 2006	TN-mix	
2007	"Aiyai Aiyai!" (愛ヤイ 愛ヤイ!)	7 February 2007	TN-mix	B-side "Koi no Honey Sweet Angel" featured in Rhythm Tengoku
2007	"Tawawa Natsu Bikini" (TAWAWA 夏ビキニ)	16 May 2007	TN-mix	Credited to "Tokito Ami with The Possible" (featuring Kaede Ōse and Kanami Morozuka)
2012	"Bye Bye to Te o Furu Watashi ni wa Namida no Ato" (バイバイと手を振る私には涙の跡)	25 July 2012	blowgrow	Released under the artist name "Talking Bunbun"
2020	"Darkness Memories" (だぁくねす☆めもりぃず)	18 September 2020	—	Digital single; theme song for Quiz RPG: The World of Mystic Wiz
2025	"Watashi wa Idol" (わたしはアイドル)	24 January 2025	wawakaka	Digital single
2025	"Nakimushi" (泣き虫)	19 December 2025	—	Digital single

=== Mini-albums and compilation albums ===
Year	Title	Release date	Label	Notes
2005	① Sanagi no Bathrobe (①さなぎのバスローブ)	7 December 2005	Good Factory Record	Debut indie mini-album. Tracklist: "Tasogare Joen no Blues", "Melon no Tameiki", "21 Seiki Made Aishite", "Fushigi na Melmo", "Kuro Neko no Tango", "Hatsumei Bijin to Painappō!!"
2006	② Suki desu... (②好きです…。)	15 March 2006	Good Factory Record	Second indie mini-album (cover songs)
2007	Tokito Ami! Best Dai 1 Kan (時東ぁみ! ベスト第1巻)	17 August 2007	TN-mix	Best-of compilation

=== Other appearances ===
Year	Release	Track(s)	Release date	Label	Notes
2008	Rhythm Tengoku Zenkyokushū (リズム天国全曲集)	"Remix 3 (Koi no Honey Sweet Angel)", "The★Bon Odori"	15 October 2008	TNX	Game soundtrack; tracks 5 and 8 on Disc 1
2012	—	"Higashiosaka Meccha Genki na 'Machi' ya nen" (東大阪めっちゃ元気な「まち」やねん)	—	—	Higashiosaka City promotional theme song (with Tsunku)
2016	Columbia Kids Kids Song Happy☆Box (コロムビアキッズ キッズソング ハッピー☆ボックス)	"Kappa no Namida" (カッパノナミダ)	24 August 2016	Nippon Columbia	Track 2; with Time Five (first CD release of the NHK Minna no Uta original TV recording)

=== Concert DVDs ===
- Tokito Ami Hatsu Live '06 Haru ~The Nakano Sunplaza~ (June 2006, Good Factory Record)
- Tokito Ami with The Possible Live '07 Haru ~Ami Kore Possi Kore~ (September 2007, Pony Canyon)

== Selected filmography ==
=== Films ===
- COACH: 40-sai no Figure Skater (2010) – Chinatsu Kasai
- Garo: Red Requiem (2010)
- Fighting Okan (2011)
- Shura no Otoko to Ienashi Shōjo (2016–2017, OV series)
- Henkō Hōdō (2026) – Chie Karasu

=== Television ===
- Kochira Katsushika-ku Kameari Kōen-mae Hashutsujo – Wasabi Toro (voice)
- Sumire 16 sai!! (2008) – Mizuki Tsukamoto
- Drama Tetsudō Musume ~Girls be ambitious!~ (2008) – Yukari Nakayama (lead role)
- Doyō Wide Gekijō: Shihō Kyōkan Hodaka Yoshiko 3 (2014)

== Photobooks ==
- Kimajime (August 2005, Saibunkan Publishing)
- Miss Magazine 2005 The Bikini Special (March 2006, Kodansha)
- Ami no Toriatsukai Setsumeisho (November 2007, Kadokawa Cross Media)
- Glamorous Baby (August 2009, Saibunkan Publishing)
- Koibito yo (July 2015, E-Net Frontier)
- Bikini & Glasses vol. 1 & vol. 2 (25 July 2025, Kodansha, digital editions)
