= Keita Amemiya =

Japanese film and television director

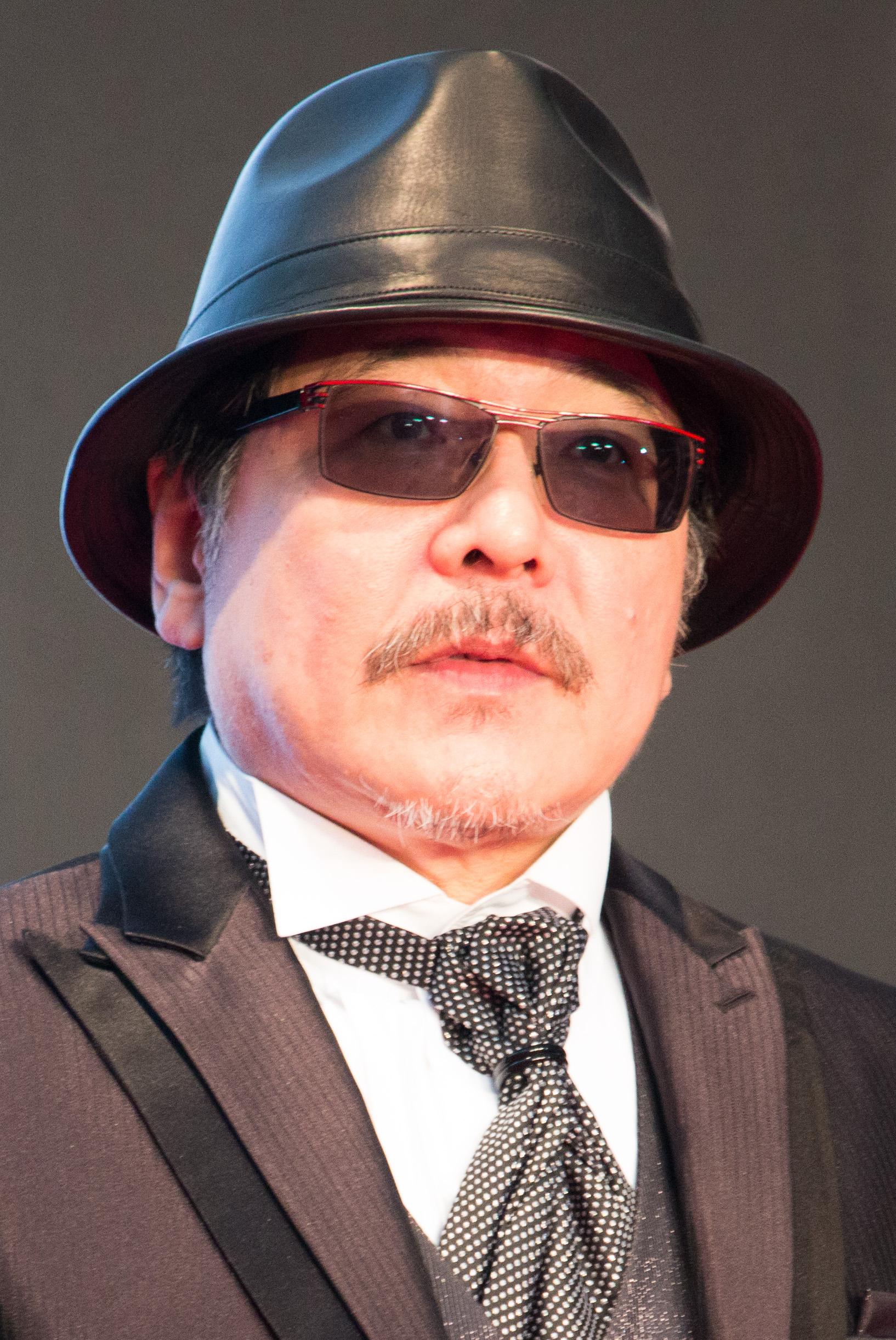
- Amemiya in 2015
- Born: 24 August 1959 (age 67); Urayasu, Chiba, Japan
- Occupations: Film director; television director; screenwriter; character designer
- Years active: 1986–present

Keita Amemiya (雨宮 慶太, Amemiya Keita; born 24 August 1959) is a Japanese film and television director, screenwriter and character designer from Urayasu, Chiba. He directed the films Mirai Ninja (1988), Zeiram (1991), Kamen Rider ZO (1993), and Kamen Rider J (1994), and created the tokusatsu franchise Garo in 2005.

== Biography ==
Born in Urayasu, Chiba, Amemiya graduated from the Asagaya College of Art and Design, after which he joined the Den Film Effect in 1981. As a film director, he made his debut in 1988's Mirai Ninja: Keigumo Kinin Gaiden. He went on to direct the 1991 science fiction film Zeiram, and created the tokusatsu franchise Garo in 2005.

== Selected filmography ==
=== Film ===
Year	Film	Director	Screenwriter	Notes	Ref(s)
1988	Mirai Ninja	Yes	Co-writer		
1991	Zeiram	Yes	Co-writer		
1993	Kamen Rider ZO	Yes	—N/a		
1994	Kamen Rider J	Yes	—N/a		
1994	Zeiram 2	Yes	—N/a		
1995	Mechanical Violator Hakaider	Yes	—N/a		
1997	Moon Over Tao: Makaraga	Yes	Co-writer		
2004	Kaidan Shin Mimibukuro: Gekijō-ban	Yes	—N/a	Segment: "Yakusoku"	
2010	Garo: Red Requiem	Yes	Co-writer		
2011	Kiba Gaiden	Yes	Yes		
2013	Garo: Soukoku no Maryu	Yes	Yes		
2013	Garo Gaiden: Tōgen no Fue	—N/a	Co-writer	Also creator	
2017	Garo: Kami no Kiba	Yes	Yes	Also creator	
2019	Garo: Under the Moonbow	Yes	—N/a	Also creator	

=== Television ===
Year	Film	Director	Screenwriter	Character / monster designer	Notes	Ref(s)
1986	Red Crow and the Ghost Ship	Yes	—N/a	—N/a	Television film	
1989	The Mobile Cop Jiban	Yes	—N/a	—N/a		
1991–1992	Chōjin Sentai Jetman	Yes	—N/a	Yes	Pilot Director	
1991–1994	Iria: Zeiram the Animation	—N/a	—N/a	—N/a	OVA; original concept	
1992	Kyōryū Sentai Zyuranger	Yes	—N/a	—N/a	2 episodes	
1993	Ultraman vs. Kamen Rider	Yes	—N/a	—N/a	Television special	
2000–2001	Tekkōki Mikazuki	Yes	—N/a	—N/a	Also creator	
2004–2005	Tweeny Witches	—N/a	—N/a	—N/a	Original creator	
2005–2006	Garo	Yes	—N/a	Yes	Also creator	
2006	G-9	Yes	Yes	—N/a		
2006	Garo Special: Beast of the Demon Night	Yes	—N/a	—N/a	Also creator	
2011–2012	Garo: Makai Senki	Yes	Yes	—N/a	Also creator	
2013	Garo: Yami o Terasu Mono	—N/a	—N/a	—N/a	Also creator	
2014	Zero: Black Blood	Yes	—N/a	—N/a	Also creator	
2014	Garo: Makai no Hana	Yes	Yes	Yes	Also creator	
2015	Garo: Gold Storm Sho	Yes	—N/a	—N/a	Also creator	
2016	Garo: Makai Retsuden	—N/a	Yes	—N/a	Also creator	
2018	Kami no Kiba: Jinga	—N/a	—N/a	—N/a	Also creator	

=== Video games ===
- Clock Tower 3: character designs
- Dual Heroes: character designs
- Final Fantasy XIV: Return to Ivalice boss designs.
- Genji: Days of the Blade: art direction
- Hagane: The Final Conflict: character designs
- Nanatsu Kaze no Shima Monogatari: character designs
- Onimusha 2: Samurai's Destiny: character designs
- Onimusha 3: Demon Siege: character designs from Onimusha 2
- Rudra no Hihō: character designs and director
- Shin Megami Tensei IV: demon designs

=== Other ===
- Convention appearances: Anime Expo (1993-07-02 to 1993-07-04), Anime NJ++ (2025-11-14 to 2025-11-16)
