= Tekkōki Mikazuki =

- Genre: Tokusatsu; Kyodai Hero
- Created by: Keita Amemiya
- Written by: Keita Amemiya; Toshiki Inoue
- Directed by: Keita Amemiya
- Starring: Yuuta Takayanagi; Saori Nara; Yasuyo Shirashima
- Opening theme: "Crescent Moon" by Don Dokken
- Composer: Hikaru Nanase
- Country of origin: Japan
- No. of episodes: 6

Production
- Executive producer: Satoshi Kayama
- Producers: Keita Amemiya; Satoshi Akamatsu; Satoru Ogura
- Cinematography: Hiroshi Kidokor; Shinji Tomita
- Running time: 47-75 minutes per episode
- Production company: Media Factory

Original release
- Network: Fuji TV
- Release: October 23, 2000 – March 24, 2001

Tekkōki Mikazuki (鉄甲機ミカヅキ; lit. "Ironclad Machine Mikazuki") is a 2000 Japanese tokusatsu television series created and directed by Keita Amemiya, written by Toshiki Inoue, and distributed by Media Factory. The series aired on Fuji TV from October 23, 2000, to March 24, 2001, although only for six episodes, and has since been released in a DVD box set on February 5, 2010. The series features several groups utilizing giant robots, including the titular Mikazuki (lit. "crescent moon" (三日月, mikazuki)), to fight monsters born of human trauma known as Idom (イドム, Idomu).
