= Shouma Yamamoto =

Japanese actor

- 山本 匠馬
- Born: Kōsuke Yamamoto; November 6, 1983 (age 42); Yao, Osaka Prefecture, Japan
- Occupation: Actor
- Years active: 2005–present
- Agent: G-STAR.PRO
- Height: 174 cm (5 ft 9 in)

Shouma Yamamoto (山本 匠馬, Yamamoto Shōma; born Kōsuke Yamamoto (山本 光将, Yamamoto Kōsuke) on November 6, 1983) is a Japanese actor. His first major role was as Tsubasa Yamagatana/Dan the Knight of the White Night in Garo Special: Byakuya no Maju. Yamamoto later portrayed Seiji Hayami in Cutie Honey: The Live. He also portrayed Takato Shiramine/Kamen Rider Rey in the Kamen Rider Kiva movie Kamen Rider Kiva: King of the Castle in the Demon World, and in the TV series as Taiga Nobori/Kamen Rider Saga. He is one of two actors to portray two different characters in a single Kamen Rider Series film and television series; the other is Kenji Matsuda in Kamen Rider Hibiki and Kamen Rider Hibiki & The Seven War Oni.

== Filmography ==
=== TV, cinema, movie ===
- 2006 - Garo Special: Byakuya no Maju as Tsubasa Yamagatana/Dan the White Knight
- 2007 - Cutie Honey: The Live as Seiji Hayami
- 2008 - Kamen Rider Kiva: King of the Castle in the Demon World as Takato Shiramine/Kamen Rider Rey
- 2008 - Kamen Rider Kiva (Tokusatsu series) as Taiga Nobori/Kamen Rider Saga & Dark Kiva
- 2009 - Kamen Rider: Dragon Knight (Tokusatsu series, Toei Channel) as Brad Barrett/Kamen Rider Thrust (Japanese dub)
- 2010 - Katekyo Hitman REBORN! as Ugetsu Asari
- 2011 - Yu-Gi-Oh Zexal as V, Yamikawa
- 2012 - Garo: Makai Senki as Tsubasa Yamagatana/Dan the White Knight
- 2012 - Garo: Soukoku no Maryu as Tsubasa Yamagatana/Dan the White Knight
- 2012 - Metal Fight Beyblade Zero-G as Sakyo Kurayami
- 2013 - Shougeki Gouraigan as Gan(Human form)
- 2014 - HappinessCharge PreCure! as Blue
- 2016 - Garo: Makai Retsuden as Tsubasa Yamagatana/Dan the White Knight
- 2016 - Twin Star Exorcists as Kinasa
- 2016 - Nanbaka as Kenshiro Yozakura
- 2017 - Yu-Gi-Oh! VRAINS as Akira Zaizen
- 2017 - Ultraman Geed as Dada (ep. 18)
- 2017 - Black Clover as Solid Silva
- 2019 - Beyblade Burst GT as Arthur Percival
- 2020 - Haikyuu!!: To The Top as Hitoshi Ginjima
- 2020 - Katekyo Hitman REBORN! the STAGE –SECRET BULLET- as Ottavio

=== Games ===
- 2016 - Band Yarouze! as Yoshimune Tokuda
- Disgaea 5 as Void Dark

=== Dubbing ===
- Bonnie & Clyde – Clyde Barrow (Emile Hirsch)
- Max Steel – Maxwell "Max" McGrath / Max Steel (Ben Winchell)
- Power Rangers Dino Force Brave – Juhyeok Kwon/Brave Gold Dino (Lee Seyoung)
- Shock Wave – Wong Tin-nok

== Discography ==
- "Roots of the King (Acoustic Edit)" with Koji Seto (2009)
