= Ryosei Konishi =

Japanese actor and voice actor (born 1982)

- 小西 遼生
- Born: Hiroki Konishi; February 20, 1982 (age 43); Tokyo, Japan
- Occupations: Actor; voice actor
- Years active: 2003–present
- Agent: Cube
- Height: 182 cm (6 ft 0 in)

Ryosei Konishi (小西 遼生, Konishi Ryōsei; born Hiroki Konishi (小西 大樹, Konishi Hiroki), February 20, 1982) is a Japanese actor and voice actor. Until January 19, 2007, he was known by his birth name. He belonged to Stardust Promotion until the end of May 2015. He is best known for portraying Kouga Saejima/GARO, the title character from the Japanese tokusatsu television series GARO from 2005 to 2006, its 2010 film adaptation, Garo: Red Requiem, and the 2011 television series Garo: Makai Senki (which serves as a sequel to the original series).

== Filmography ==
=== PV (Promotional Video) ===
- 2003 Kou Shibasaki 「nemurenai yoru nemuranai yume」
- 2004 Ruppina 「in the name of love」

=== Movies ===
- 2004 Toshio no Heya
- 2006 Luna Heights 2 | Runa haitsu 2
- 2008 Heibon Ponch (Good-looking Mashima)
- 2008 Triple Complex Returns
- 2009 Hijoshi Zukan (Actor#2)
- 2009 Hana Guerilla (Yusuke)
- 2010 Garo: Red Requiem .... Kouga Saejima/GARO
- 2013 Garo: Soukoku no Maryu .... Kouga Saejima/GARO
- 2019 Garo: Gekkou no Tabibito .... Kouga Saejima/GARO

=== TV drama ===
- 2003 Modoken Quill no Issho
- 2003 Victory! Futto Girls no Seishun
- 2005 GARO .... Kouga Saejima/GARO
- 2006 Komyo ga Tsuji (Takenaka Kyuusaku)
- 2006 Garo Special: Byakuya no Maju .... Kouga Saejima/GARO
- 2007 Koibana
- 2009 LOVE GAME (Shinozaki)
- 2011 Garo: Makai Senki .... Kouga Saejima/GARO
- 2025 No.1 Sentai Gozyuger .... Momiji Iwa/DekaRed

=== Anime television series (Voice acting roles) ===
- 2004 School Rumble (Ōji Karasuma)
- 2005 Sugar Sugar Rune (Pierre, Glace)
- 2006 G-9 (3-5-10/Sa-go-juu)

=== Theatre ===
- The Prince of Tennis Musical (Shinji Ibu)
- Hunter x Hunter Play (Kuroro Lucifer)
- 2007 The Light in the Piazza (Fabrizio Naccarelli)
- 2007–2009 Les Misérables (Marius)
- 2011 Dracula (Jonathan Harker)
- 2013 Piaf (Charles Aznavour)
- 2013 Next to Normal (Gabe)
- 2014 Thrill Me (Richard Loeb)
- 2017–2020 Frankenstein (Henry Clerval Dupre, Monster)
- 2019 Natasha, Pierre and the Great Comet of 1812 (Anatole Kuragin)
- 2021 Musical GOYA
- 2026 Mary Poppins (George Banks)

=== Video game ===
- Dragon Quest Swords: The Masked Queen and the Tower of Mirrors (Dean)
