= Garo (TV series) =

Japanese tokusatsu franchise

- Title screen
- Genre: Tokusatsu; Superhero; Horror
- Created by: Keita Amemiya
- Developed by: Kengo Kaji
- Directed by: Keita Amemiya
- Starring: Hiroki Konishi; Mika Hijii; Ray Fujita; Masaki Kyomoto
- Composers: Shinji Kinoshita; Kōichi Ōta
- Country of origin: Japan
- Original language: Japanese
- No. of episodes: 25 (list of episodes)

Production
- Executive producers: Minoru Kubo; Kiyotaka Ninomiya; Makoto Shiraishi
- Producers: Kōichi Ishida; Hiroyuki Hattori; Junpei Nakagawa
- Running time: 24–25 minutes (per episode)
- Production company: Tohokushinsha Film

Original release
- Network: TXN (TV Tokyo)
- Release: October 7, 2005 – March 31, 2006

Related
- Garo Special: Beast of the Demon Night

Garo (牙狼〈GARO〉; lit. "Fanged Wolf", stylized as GARO), sometimes referred to as Golden Knight Garo (黄金騎士ガロ, Ōgon Kishi Garo), is a Japanese tokusatsu television series broadcast on TV Tokyo and its affiliates from October 7, 2005, to March 31, 2006, lasting 25 episodes (with one additional "Overview" special, summarizing the events of episodes 1 through 12, aired before episode 14). The series was created and directed by Keita Amemiya (Kamen Rider ZO, Zeiram) with supporting direction from Makoto Yokoyama and Kengo Kaji . The creature designer was Yasushi Nirasawa, known for his later work as the designer of the Worms and the Imagin for respectively Kamen Rider Kabuto and Den-O, as well as for his work designing the Undeads from Kamen Rider Blade.

Since 2007, the show has also been aired in other countries such as Italy (on MTV), Malaysia (on 8TV), and Spain (on Canal Buzz). The show's HD remastered version was broadcast on TV Tokyo starting July 8, 2016. The television series is the first installment of the "GARO" metaseries, which is composed of several installments, including a live action television series, films, TV & film specials, and anime series. The television series has been licensed for a North American release by Kraken Releasing.

== Plot ==
Garo focuses on the life of Kouga Saejima, who has assumed the title of Makai Knight to protect humanity against dark demonic manifestations called "Horrors". In his quest to destroy them, he encounters a young girl named Kaoru, whom he saves from a Horror, though he learns that she is stained with its demonic blood. As a rule, those that have been stained by the blood of a Horror must be killed, or else they will die painfully in approximately 100 days. Kouga spares Kaoru and tries to find a way to purify her before her remaining time expires. Thus, the series focuses on Kouga's developing relationship with Kaoru, and his responsibilities protecting humanity in accordance with the wishes of his father, the previous Garo. In the process, he encounters another Makai Knight named Rei Suzumura, who eventually becomes his ally. Later Kouga confronts his father's former disciple who is revealed to be the cause of a recent series of Horror attacks in preparation of a more sinister advent of the Horrors' originator, Messiah.

== Horrors ==
The main antagonistic form in the series, Horrors are demons that reside in a realm known as the netherworld, and thrive on the darkness of humanity. The Horrors enter the human world through everyday objects known as Inga Gates, which are created through a mass of darkness. When the Horrors first come through, they also known as Inga Horrors, and must possess the body of the first human with inner darkness they come across. Because the Horrors feed on humans inner darkness, it is a Makai Knight's duty to hunt and slay the demons. Later entries in the series reveal several more types of Horrors.

== Episodes ==
No.	Title	Written by	Original release date
Picture Book
1	"Picture Book"; Transliteration: "Ehon" (Japanese: 絵本)	Kengo Kaji; Yuji Kobayashi	October 7, 2005
Inga
2	"Inga"; Transliteration: "Inga" (Japanese: 陰我)	Kengo Kaji; Yuji Kobayashi	October 14, 2005
Clock
3	"Clock"; Transliteration: "Tokei" (Japanese: 時計)	Kengo Kaji; Yuji Kobayashi	October 21, 2005
Dinner
4	"Dinner"; Transliteration: "Bansan" (Japanese: 晩餐)	Kengo Kaji; Yuji Kobayashi	October 28, 2005
Moonlight
5	"Moonlight"; Transliteration: "Gekkō" (Japanese: 月光)	Kengo Kaji; Yuji Kobayashi	November 4, 2005
Beauty
6	"Beauty"; Transliteration: "Bibō" (Japanese: 美貌)	Kengo Kaji; Sotaro Hayashi	November 11, 2005
Silver Fang
7	"Silver Fang"; Transliteration: "Ginga" (Japanese: 銀牙)	Kengo Kaji; Keita Amemiya	November 18, 2005
Ring
8	"Ring"; Transliteration: "Yubiwa" (Japanese: 指輪)	Kengo Kaji; Yuji Kobayashi	November 25, 2005
Ordeal
9	"Trial"; Transliteration: "Shiren" (Japanese: 試練)	Kengo Kaji; Yuji Kobayashi; Keita Amemiya	December 2, 2005
Puppet
10	"Doll"; Transliteration: "Ningyō" (Japanese: 人形)	Yuji Kobayashi; Kengo Kaji	December 9, 2005
Game
11	"Game"; Transliteration: "Yūgi" (Japanese: 遊戯)	Sotaro Hayashi; Kengo Kaji	December 16, 2005
Taiga
12	"Taiga"; Transliteration: "Taiga" (Japanese: 大河)	Kengo Kaji; Keita Amemiya	December 23, 2005
Promise
13	"Promise"; Transliteration: "Yakusoku" (Japanese: 約束)	Kei Taguchi	January 6, 2006
Nightmare
14	"Nightmare"; Transliteration: "Akumu" (Japanese: 悪夢)	Yuji Kobayashi; Kengo Kaji	January 13, 2006
Statue
15	"Idol"; Transliteration: "Gūzō" (Japanese: 偶像)	Yuji Kobayashi; Kengo Kaji	January 20, 2006
Red Sake
16	"Red Sake"; Transliteration: "Akazake" (Japanese: 赤酒)	Yuji Kobayashi; Keita Amemiya	January 27, 2006
Aquarium
17	"Tank"; Transliteration: "Suisō" (Japanese: 水槽)	Yuji Kobayashi; Kengo Kaji	February 3, 2006
World Charm
18	"Realm Charm"; Transliteration: "Kaifu" (Japanese: 界符)	Yuji Kobayashi; Sotaro Hayashi; Kengo Kaji	February 10, 2006
Black Flame
19	"Black Fire"; Transliteration: "Kokuen" (Japanese: 黒炎)	Yuji Kobayashi; Sotaro Hayashi; Kengo Kaji	February 17, 2006
Life
20	"Life"; Transliteration: "Inochi" (Japanese: 生命)	Yuji Kobayashi; Sotaro Hayashi; Kengo Kaji	February 24, 2006
Magic Bullet
21	"Magic Bullet"; Transliteration: "Madan" (Japanese: 魔弾)	Yuji Kobayashi	March 3, 2006
Engraving
22	"Mark"; Transliteration: "Kokuin" (Japanese: 刻印)	Yuji Kobayashi	March 10, 2006
Heart Destruction
23	"Soul Ruination"; Transliteration: "Shinmetsu" (Japanese: 心滅)	Yuji Kobayashi; Keita Amemiya	March 17, 2006
Girl
24	"Girl"; Transliteration: "Shōjo" (Japanese: 少女)	Yuji Kobayashi; Kengo Kaji; Keita Amemiya	March 24, 2006
Heroic Spirits
25	"Heroic Spirits"; Transliteration: "Eirei" (Japanese: 英霊)	Yuji Kobayashi; Keita Amemiya	March 31, 2006
Smile
Ex	"Garo Side Story: Smile"; Transliteration: "Garo Gaiden Egao" (Japanese: GARO外伝 笑顔)	Yuji Kobayashi; Kengo Kaji	October 7, 2006

== Cast ==
- Kouga Saejima (冴島 鋼牙, Saejima Kōga): Hiroki Konishi (小西 大樹, Konishi Hiroki)
- Kaoru Mitsuki (御月 カオル, Mitsuki Kaoru): Mika Hijii (肘井 美佳, Hijii Mika)
- Rei Suzumura (涼邑 零, Suzumura Rei): Ray Fujita (藤田 玲, Fujita Rei)
- Karune Ryuzaki (龍崎 駈音, Ryūzaki Karune): Masaki Kyomoto (京本 政樹, Kyōmoto Masaki)
- Gonza Kurahashi (倉橋 ゴンザ, Kurahashi Gonza): Yukijiro Hotaru (螢 雪次朗, Hotaru Yukijirō)
- Kale (ケイル, Keiru): Keaki Watanabe (渡辺 けあき, Watanabe Keaki)
- Bell (ベル, Beru): Anri Okamoto (岡本 杏理, Okamoto Anri)
- Rose (ローズ, Rōzu): Yukina Kashiwa (柏 幸奈, Kashiwa Yukina)
- Kodama (コダマ): Mark Musashi (マーク武蔵, Māku Musashi)
- Madō Ring Zaruba (魔導輪ザルバ, Madōrin Zaruba; Voice): Hironobu Kageyama (影山 ヒロノブ, Kageyama Hironobu)
- Madō Necklace Silva (魔導具シルヴァ, Madōgu Shiruva; Voice): Ai Orikasa (折笠 愛, Orikasa Ai)
- Kale (Voice): Fumiko Inoue (井上 富美子, Inoue Fumiko)
- Bell (Voice): Machiko Kawana (川名 真知子, Kawana Machiko)
- Rose (Voice): Akemi Satō (佐藤 朱, Satō Akemi)

== Songs ==
Opening themes

- "Theme of GARO"
  - Music by TRYFORCE and JAM Project
- "Garo ~Savior in the Dark~" (牙狼～SAVIOR IN THE DARK～)
  - Lyrics & Composition: Hironobu Kageyama
  - Arrangement: Kenichi Sudō
  - Artist: JAM Project

Ending themes

- "Garo ~Boku ga Ai o Tsutaeteyuku~" (牙狼～僕が愛を伝えてゆく～; "GARO ~I'll Keep Showing You My Love~")
  - Lyrics & Composition: Masaki Kyomoto
  - Arrangement: Harukichi Yamamoto
  - Artist: Masaki Kyomoto (ep. 1–13) and Garo Project (ep. 22)
- "Boku wa Mada Koi o Shite wa Ikenai" (僕はまだ恋をしてはいけない; "I Shouldn't Still Be Loving")
  - Lyrics & Composition: Masaki Kyomoto
  - Arrangement: Harukichi Yamamoto
  - Artist: Masaki Kyomoto (ep. 14–21) and Garo Project (ep. 23 & 24)

== Production ==
According to early concepts, Garo was originally intended to be a modernized version of the Japanese superhero character Golden Bat where he would be known as "Skull Z".

== Sequels and spin-offs ==
In all the sequels and spinoffs in the Garo series, Hironobu Kageyama continues to reprise his role as the voice of Zaruba in each entry.

=== Video games ===
A video game based on the series was produced by Bandai for the PlayStation 2, under the name Golden Knight Garo. Two versions were released: a 'normal' version with the game disk, instructions, and standard pamphlets, and a more expensive 'Limited Edition' version which came with a green 'Fire' recolor of the metal Zaruba ring from the "Equip and Prop Vol. 1" Garo toy.

A mobile game titled Garo: Makai no Meikyu (牙狼<GARO> -魔戒の迷宮-, Garo Makai no Meikyū; lit. "Garo: Makai Labyrinth") was released on May 27, 2016, commemorating the 10th anniversary of the Garo franchise. The game includes all characters from the live action series and the anime series.

=== Novels ===
Makai Kishi Retsuden: Hagane no Houkou (魔戒騎士列伝 鋼の咆哮, Makai Kishi Retsuden Hagane no Hōkō; lit. "Makai Knight History: Roar of Steel") was released on March 31, 2007.

Garo: Ankoku Makai Kishi Hen (牙狼〈GARO〉暗黒魔戒騎士篇; lit. "Garo: Dark Makai Knight Saga") was released on October 26, 2006. The novel's new edition including one new episode was released on October 30, 2010.

Garo: Youseki no Wana (牙狼〈GARO〉妖赤の罠, Garo Yōseki no Wana; lit. "Garo: Mystic Red Trap") was released on November 27, 2010.

=== Beast of the Demon Night ===
Garo Special: Beast of the Demon Night (牙狼〈GARO〉スペシャル 白夜の魔獣, Garo Supesharu Byakuya no Majū; lit. "Garo Special: Demon Beast of the Midnight Sun") is a two-part mini-series that premiered on Family Gekijo in December 2006.

=== Red Requiem ===
In July 2009, Tohokushinsha Film announced that a GARO feature film will be released in the fall of 2010. Garo: Red Requiem (牙狼〈GARO〉～RED REQUIEM～) was theatrically released in Japanese theaters on October 30, 2010. The story is a sequel to the original TV series, with Keita Amemiya reprising his role as head director. Ryosei Konishi and Hironobu Kageyama reprise their roles as Kouga/Garo and voice of Zaruba, with Makoto Yokoyama returning to choreograph the action sequences as well. Red Requiem uses 3D image technology developed by the Tohokushinsha group company Omnibus Japan for its visual effects.

=== Kiba ===
Kiba Gaiden (呀〈KIBA〉～暗黒騎士鎧伝～, Kiba Ankoku Kishi Gaiden; lit. "Kiba: Dark Knight Side Story"), released on September 7, 2011, is a spin-off V-Cinema featuring the story of Barago and Kiba the Dark Knight.

=== Makai Senki ===
Garo: Makai Senki (牙狼〈GARO〉～MAKAISENKI～) is a second season of the Garo television series that premiered in select Japanese theaters on September 24, 2011, before beginning broadcast on TV Tokyo on October 6, 2011.

=== Soukoku no Maryu ===
Garo: Soukoku no Maryu (牙狼〈GARO〉～蒼哭ノ魔竜～, Garo Sōkoku no Maryū; lit. "Garo: Demon Dragon of the Blue Cries") (Note: Also known by the English title Garo and the Wailing Dragon.) was released in Japanese theaters on February 23, 2013, serving as an epilogue to Makai Senki, depicting Kouga Saejima's journey to the Promised Ground to retrieve Gajari's body. Ryosei Konishi was initially the only confirmed member of the cast, but Ray Fujita, Shouma Yamamoto, Ozuno Nakamura, Yukijirō Hotaru, Hironobu Kageyama, and Hiroyuki Watanabe were later confirmed to appear in the film. Guest stars include Yuki Kubota as Kakashi, Anna Aoi as Meru, Tetsuya Yanagihara as Esaruto, and Keiko Matsuzaka as Judam.

=== Yami o Terasu Mono ===
A third TV series titled Garo: Yami o Terasu Mono (牙狼〈GARO〉～闇を照らす者～; lit. "Garo: The One Who Shines in the Darkness") was broadcast on TV Tokyo from April 5 to September 20, 2013. The series is set in the near future, and features an entirely new story with a new Garo named Ryuga Dougai venturing into the Horror-plagued Vol City. The series also presents a brand new main cast that includes Wataru Kuriyama, Tsunenori Aoki, Junya Ikeda and fashion model Miki Nanri.

=== Tougen no Fue ===
In March 2013, the Garo team announced a new film titled Garo Gaiden: Tougen no Fue (牙狼外伝 桃幻の笛, Garo Gaiden Tōgen no Fue; lit. "Garo Side Story: The Tougen Flute"), which was released in Japanese theaters on July 20 of that year. Set during the time of Soukoku no Maryu, Tougen no Fue follows Makai Priestesses Jabi and Rekka as they travel to the northern forests to protect the mystical and titular flute. Yasue Sato, Mary Matsuyama, Masahiro Kuranuki, and Kanji Tsuda reprise their roles from the franchise as Makai Priestess Jabi, Makai Priestess Rekka, Makai Priest Shiguto, and Makai Knight Kengi, respectively, also appearing in the film are Kumi Takiuchi and Miku Oono.

=== Zero: Black Blood ===
Zero: Black Blood (絶狼〈ZERO〉-BLACK BLOOD-) is a spin-off six-episode miniseries starring Ray Fujita as his character Rei Suzumura from the original TV series. Rounding out the cast are Riria Kojima as Yuna, Naoki Takeshi as Kain, and Thane Camus as Ring. Keita Amemiya serves as executive director, with Ryu Kaneda directing and Yasuko Kobayashi writing. It was broadcast on Family Gekijo in March 2014 and shown in Japanese theaters in a limited release. JAM Project performed the opening theme "ZERO-BLACK BLOOD-" and Fujita's band Dustz performs the ending "S#0 (Scene Number Zero)" (S#0(シーンナンバーゼロ), Shīn Nanbā Zero).

=== Makai no Hana ===
A fourth Garo television series titled Garo: Makai no Hana (牙狼〈GARO〉-魔戒ノ花-; lit. "Garo: The Makai Flower") was broadcast on TV Tokyo from April 4 to September 26, 2014, and takes place between Makai Senki and Yami o Terasu Mono. With the exception of Yukijiro Hotaru reprising his portrayal of Gonza, it features a new cast consisting of Masei Nakayama as Raiga Saejima, the son of Kouga and Kaoru who inherited his father's title as the Golden Knight Garo, Atomu Mizuishi as Crow the Phantom Knight, and Natsumi Ishibashi as Mayuri, a mysterious tool with mystical powers that takes the form of a young woman.

=== Anime series ===
An anime adaptation of Garo was released in October 2014, titled in Japan as Garo: Honō no Kokuin (牙狼〈GARO〉-炎の刻印-; lit. "Garo: The Carved Seal of Flames"). It is produced by Studio MAPPA and directed by Yuichiro Hayashi. Taking place in the fictional country of Valiante in the Middle Ages, head writer Yasuko Kobayashi explained that, with the exception of Zaruba, it is unrelated to any characters or stories in the rest of the Garo continuity, though still exists as part of the larger universe's timeline. The series has been licensed by Funimation as Garo: The Animation, making it the first Garo installment to see a North American release.

A second series titled Garo: Guren no Tsuki (牙狼〈GARO〉-紅蓮ノ月-; lit. "Garo: The Crimson Moon"), taking place in Japan's Heian period, was announced for a 2015 release, alongside a film sequel of the first series titled Garo: Divine Flame, to coincide with the Garo tenth anniversary.

A film sequel of the first series titled Garo: Divine Flame (牙狼〈GARO〉-DIVINE FLAME-) was released in Japanese theaters on May 21, 2016.

A third series titled Garo: Vanishing Line (牙狼〈GARO〉-VANISHING LINE-) was broadcast on TV Tokyo from October 6, 2017, to March 30, 2018.

A film sequel of the second series titled Garo: The Fleeting Cherry Blossom (薄墨桜 -GARO-, Usuzumizakura -GARO-; lit. "Gray Cherry Blossoms: Garo") premiered in Japanese theaters on October 6, 2018.

=== Gold Storm Sho ===
Garo: Gold Storm Sho (牙狼〈GARO〉－GOLDSTORM－翔, Garo Gōrudo Sutōmu Shō; lit. "Garo: Gold Storm Flight") is both a film and a television series that serve as sequels to Yami o Terasu Mono. Wataru Kuriyama and Miki Nanri reprise their roles and are joined by new cast members, among them Masahiro Inoue as the series antagonist Jinga. The film adaptation was released in Japanese theatres on March 28, 2015, while the television series was broadcast on TV Tokyo from April 3 to September 18, 2015.

=== Bikuu ===
Bikuu (媚空－ビクウ－, Bikū) is a film starring Sayaka Akimoto reprising her role as Bikuu from Makai no Hana. It was released in Japanese theaters on November 14, 2015. Akimoto performs the ending theme "Sengetsu ~Hikari to Yami no Soba de~" (繊月～光と闇の傍で～; lit. "Crescent Moon ~Beside the Light and Darkness~").

=== Makai Retsuden ===
Garo: Makai Retsuden (牙狼〈GARO〉魔戒烈伝; lit. "Garo: History of Makai") is an omnibus television series which features the cast of the previous live action series. It celebrates the 10th anniversary of the Garo franchise and was broadcast on TV Tokyo from April 8 to June 24, 2016.

=== Ashura ===
Garo: Ashura (牙狼〈GARO〉-阿修羅-) is a special episode, with the Garo production team collaborating with New Japan Pro-Wrestling to commemorate the 10th anniversary of the Garo franchise. It features Hiroshi Tanahashi as Gouki and Togi Makabe and was broadcast on TV Tokyo on July 1, 2016. Taking place between Makai Senki and Makai no Hana, Kaoru tells a young Raiga the story of one of the first Makai Knights to bear the Garo title: Gouki.

=== Zero: Dragon Blood ===
A brand new television series about Ray Fujita's character Rei Suzumura was originally announced as one of many new projects the Garo Project team were working on in 2015 and it was originally just known as Zero. In June 2016, it was announced that the series would be titled Zero: Dragon Blood (絶狼〈ZERO〉-DRAGON BLOOD-) to be broadcast in 2017. It was broadcast on TV Tokyo from January 6 to March 31, 2017.

=== Live stage shows ===
Garo: Kami no Kiba Mezame (牙狼〈GARO〉-神ノ牙 覚醒-; lit. "Garo: Fang of God - Awakening") features Masahiro Inoue's character Jinga and is connected to Garo: Kami no Kiba. It was held between November 29 to December 3, 2017, at Space Zero in Yoyogi.

Kami no Kiba: Jinga Tensei (神ノ牙 -JINGA- 転生; lit. "Fang of God: Jinga - Reincarnation") features Masahiro Inoue's character Jinga and is connected to Kami no Kiba: Jinga. It was held between January 5 to January 14, 2019, at The Galaxy Theatre in Higashishinagawa.

=== Kami no Kiba ===
Garo: Kami no Kiba (牙狼〈GARO〉-神ノ牙-; lit. "Garo: Fang of God") is a film of the series featuring Wataru Kuriyama's character Ryuga Dougai, along the main cast of Yami o Terasu Mono and Gold Storm Sho. It was released in Japanese theaters on January 6, 2018.

=== Kami no Kiba: Jinga ===
In November 2017, series creator Keita Amemiya announced plans for a spin-off television series, titled Kami no Kiba: Jinga (神ノ牙 -JINGA-, lit. "Fang of God: Jinga"), featuring Masahiro Inoue's character Jinga was in the works. In July 2018, it was announced that the series is scheduled to be broadcast in October of that year. It was broadcast on Tokyo MX from October 4 to December 27, 2018.

=== Gekkou no Tabibito ===
Garo: Gekkou no Tabibito (牙狼〈GARO〉-月虹ノ旅人-, Garo Gekkō no Tabibito; lit. "Garo: Moonbow Traveler") (Note: Also known by the English title Garo: Under the Moonbow.) is a film that stars Masei Nakayama as Raiga Saejima serving as a sequel to the Makai no Hana television series, also including Hiroki Konishi who reprise his role as the original protagonist Kouga Saejima. After the production announcement in November 2014, it was announced in November 2018 that the film is scheduled to be released in theaters in 2019. It was released in Japanese theaters on October 4, 2019.

A three part mini series, P Garo: Saejima Kouga was streamed on YouTube prior to the release of the film.

=== Versus Road ===
Garo: Versus Road is a television series, which celebrates the 15th anniversary of the Garo franchise that premiered on Tokyo MX on April 2, 2020. It features a brand new cast that includes Koya Matsudai, Yuhi, Tokito, Toman, Naoya Shimizu, and Shutaro Kadoshita. This series is set in a different continuity from those of previous entries in the franchise.

=== Hagane o Tsugu Mono ===
Garo: Hagane o Tsugu Mono (牙狼〈GARO〉ハガネを継ぐ者; lit. "Garo: Heir to Hagane") (Note: Also known by the English title Garo: Heir to Steel Armor.) is a television series that premiered on Tokyo MX and BS Nittele on January 11, 2024, featuring Wataru Kuriyama's character Ryuga Dougai.

=== Taiga ===
Garo: Taiga (牙狼〈GARO〉TAIGA) is a film that celebrates the 20th anniversary of the Garo franchise and features a younger version of Hiroyuki Watanabe's character Taiga Saejima. It was released in Japanese theaters on October 17, 2025.

=== Higashi no Kairou ===
Garo: Higashi no Kairou (牙狼〈GARO〉東ノ界楼, Garo Higashi no Kairō; lit. "Garo: Kairou of the East") (Note: Also known by the English title Garo: Sentinel of the East.) is a television series that premiered on Tokyo MX and BS Nittele on January 29, 2026, featuring Wataru Kuriyama's character Ryuga Dougai.
