= List of net idols =

This is a list of net idols, a type of Japanese-style entertainer who conducts their activities through the Internet.

- Beckii Cruel
- Francesca Dani
- Danceroid
- Keekihime
- Magibon
- Venus Angelic

== See also ==
- List of Japanese idols
