= Horror (Garo) =

Fictional monsters in the Garo series

Demon Beasts Horrors (魔獣ホラー, Majū Horā) are fictional monsters and the antagonists in the Japanese tokusatsu series Garo.

== Fictional history ==
The Horrors are demons that originate from a Demon World (魔界, Makai). The usual variety of Horrors, called "Inga Horrors" (陰我ホラー, Inga Horā) (Note: The kanji that make up the name "Inga" (陰我) are literally translated as "Yin Self".) are grotesque black-winged skeletal demons that enter the human world, drawn by their primary "food" of human malice and darkness. They use Inga gates, objects tainted by darkness from either playing a role in a naturally-accumulated atrocity like mass murder or an unresolved traumatic experience. There are also Inga gates that are created by someone infusing the object with dark energies. Regardless, all Inga gates are usually activated when a person with inner darkness approaches them, with the emerging Horror turning that person or any other living thing nearby into a host body.

From there, either taking over the host or forming a symbiosis to act out the host's dark desires, the Horror "evolves" into a unique form based on the gate they emerged from, each with their own personal tastes and feeding habits. Normally a human is dead the moment that an Inga Horror possesses them and what remains of the host follows the Horror in death as well. The Makai Knight Jinga seemingly possessed the unique ability to purge a Horror out of its human host with the human restored to their original self, but it is later revealed that he only suppressed the Horrors, and it only worked due to the original Jinga's machinations. Though rare, there are also some unusual Horrors that prefer to possess objects rather than living things, not having a preference for specific prey, as they consume whoever comes into close contact one way or another instead. But the rarest Horrors are the ones that assume the form of large beasts without needing a host body, acting only on a primal and indiscriminate urge to feed.

Three commonalities all Inga Horrors share is a preference of hunting at night, their blood marking someone for death as Horrors will have an increased desirability for the afflicted, and speaking in the Makai language which can be understood by someone well-versed in the language or a potential host, usually adopting a human language upon possession. While slain on a regular basis, Horrors can never truly die so long as darkness exists in the hearts of men. Upon a physical death, the Horror's essence is sealed within a Makaiken until its essence is formed into a dagger that is entrusted to a Watchdog to be sent back to the Demon World. Though there is a one night relief in the Inga Lapsing Night (陰我消滅の晩, Inga Shōmetsu no Ban) that occurs once every 20 years to bar any passage of Horrors into the human world, a slain Inga Horror can still return later. Trace essences of slain Horrors latch onto a Makai Knight and accumulate, requiring him to undergo a ritualistic purification periodically. In the case of those who bear the title of Garo, the essence of Horrors that the Garo user slain eventually forms into a Zaji, vowing slay whoever is holding the title of Garo at the moment. While Inga Horrors taken on human forms have no weakness against sunlight and can operate normally during daytime, they have an aversion nonetheless of showing their true forms under broad daylight. As such, Makai Knights almost never need to draw their blades for combat before sundown.

While stronger Horrors, especially those evolved to have unique forms and powers, tend to live and hunt alone when they make it into the human world, the weaker ones with no desire to hunt on their own and dependent on others to feed tend to band together and form small community pockets, as revealed in "Garo: Makai Retsuden". Each of these communities have their own hideouts called "forts", despite having no fortifications of any kind. The forts have cages in which humans are kept as livestock to be consumed later. These Horrors are weak enough that a lone Makai Knight prove more than enough to wipe a dozen or two of them out within minutes.

Despite their nature as enemies of humanity, some recurrent ones gaining so much notoriety that they are named and documented. Horrors are not always targeted for elimination. At times, they are re-purposed by Makai Priests to serve various functions, such as for sealing of other more powerful Horrors, experimentation, or those like Sedinbale sealed to provide their vast knowledge on various Makai-related matters. Even Madōgu (魔導具, Madōgu) like Zaruba are created with Horrors that hold no enmity against humanity and have pledged their loyalty to the Makai order, the created items entrusted to certain Makai Knights of prestige.

In the events of Yami o Terasu Mono and Zero: Black Blood, given humans as payment for their loyalty as familiars, the Inga Horrors are shown to be significantly weaker as they can be killed by Makai Knights at a quicker pace. These Inga Horrors lack unique Horror forms, mostly seen only in their human form even during battle while some can assume their true usual Horror form.

In the events of Versus Road, a new form of Inga Horror is seen as an enemy that hunts down players. These Horrors appear to be modified with cybernetic enhancements, which seem to serve as restraints or control devices. The game world Horrors are shown to be incredibly fast, able to clear large distances in an instant. Despite the slight increase in physical ability granted to them by the game world, the players, being otherwise normal humans, are quickly overwhelmed by even one of these Horrors and generally opt to either flee or hide when encountering one.

== Messiah the Ultimate Horror ==
Messiah (メシア, Meshia) is the originator of all Horrors from the True Demon World (真魔界, Shin Makai) and has existed well before the beginning of the conflict between the Makai community and Horrors. Messiah is the most unusual Horror because she is the only Horror that appears almost perfectly human in form, resembling a giant white-skinned half-naked woman with long-clawed fingers and unique jewelry and tattoos around her head and shoulders. Her back contains a Taoist round disc. While the full range of her powers are never revealed, Messiah's abilities include magical shielding, animating her body tattoos into cannons, summoning Horrors by merely touching the ground she walks upon, and flight.

Messiah had long desired to enter the human realm but she could not cross through without a large source of energy. After sensing Barago's desperation for power, Messiah reveals herself in a Madō Book that contains forbidden techniques. Though only a shade of her true self, Messiah offers to give Barago the knowledge and power of the forbidden Makai methods in return to bring about the legendary Kiba. Barago wholeheartedly agrees to give up his soul for power and Messiah proceeds to start him on his path of destroying lives to set up the conditions to summon her in her full glory through Kaoru, who is a suitable vessel due to the conditions of her age and birth. But once he fulfills his part in her summoning by removing any trace of humanity in him, upon being awakened Messiah absorbs Barago using Kaoru's body as a medium to use his power to complete the process. Her plans to reach the human world are foiled by Kouga, who enters her realm and defeats her with spiritual help from Kaoru. She is ultimately defeated when, overconfident with her powers, she arrogantly fails to stop Kouga from running his sword into her head after he discards his armor. Shocked at how a normal human has defeated her, Messiah is forced back into her dormant state while releasing Kiba.

During the events of Makai no Hana, it is revealed that Messiah can also be summoned to the human world through the blooming of the Demon Beast Eyrith. It becomes the goal of Kouga's son Raiga to prevent the return of one of his father's enemies by hunting down Eyrith with the help of Mayuri.

During the events of Kami no Kiba, Rinza reveals she facilitated Jinga's resurrection so she could use him and the God's Fang to create a gate on the Moon to summon Messiah. After the God's Fang was destroyed, Messiah awakens from her dormant state in the Makai and is confronted by Jinga in his Horror form. Kami no Kiba: Jinga would reveal that Messiah destroyed Jinga, causing his reincarnation into a human.

Messiah is portrayed by Sho Nishino (西野 翔, Nishino Shō). In Kiba Gaiden, she is voiced by Asami (亜紗美) in a flashback and Mika Hijii (肘井 美佳, Hijii Mika) while possessing her body.

== Garo ==
These are the Horrors that appear during Garo.

- Anglay (アングレイ, Angurei): The 12th Horror to appear, Anglay is a trapper able to bring artwork to life. The Horror poses as a female nude portrait within a painting until the gallery owner, Tasuke Taniyama (谷山 太輔, Taniyama Tasuke), finds it and is possessed by it. The monster has a taste for young women, liquifying them into paint for consumption, and targets Kaoru. But Kouga's appearance forces the monster to lock down the art exhibit. In the fight with Kouga, Anglay bursts out from its host and manifests itself into a painting, gaining an acidic paint-muck exterior with a frame collar until it regresses to its original form. Garo kills it and Kaoru stained by the Horror's blood as a result. Taniyama is portrayed by Toru Minegishi (峰岸 徹, Tōru Minegishi).
- Ishutarb (イシュターブ, Ishutābu): The 13th Horror. Emerging from a chain, it possesses the body of Azusa Kujō (九条 あずさ, Kujō Azusa), a con-woman who takes advantage of money-minded people using an IT company as a front. Using its host's plan, Ishutarb uses money to lure it victims to meet it at nighttime. From there, it would rip them to shreds with chains shooting from Kujō's body and ingest the pieces caught by its chains' links. it is about to kill Kaoru when dumb luck and Kouga stops her. During the fight, Ishutarb alters it host's form into an iron maiden-like armored form. Garo kills it in a parking lot. Kujō is portrayed by Kahori Fujii (藤井 かほり, Fujii Kahori).
- Morax (モラックス, Morakkusu): A unique Horror that has no need for a human host, once said to have wiped out an entire village in one night. Possessing a time-piece, altering it into a variety of forms, Morax lures those driven by time to pick him up. Once he has a hold on his victim, by after dusk, it dehydrates the victim until only dust remains. Forced to use humans as host, Morax takes advantage of Kouga's sympathy for humans to escape. Once he captures Kaoru, Morax assumes the form of a clock tower. Though he is armed with arsenal of bladed arms, Morax is killed finally by Garo, ripped out of his vessel as it crumbles to the ground.
- Pazuzu (パズズ): A Horror that first appeared around the time Taiga was alive. It takes over the body of Ryōichi Tategami (立神 亮一, Tategami Ryōichi), making him a miracle worker of a surgeon so Pazuzu can feed on the euphoria-enriched blood of Tategami's patients. it slices them apart with the scalpel-bladed tendrils from the back of its head, while leaving the remains for its Horror minions. To ensure it could eat without interference, it erects a barrier to put any Makai Knight at a disadvantage. Kouga has trouble until he uses Kaoru to remove the seals that power the barrier. Upon Pazuzu's last moments, it pleas to devour Kaoru as its last meal. Utterly repulsed by this idea, Garo delivers the final blow, thus ending its reign of terror. Tategami is portrayed by Taishu Kase (加勢 大周, Kase Taishū).
- Lunarken (ルナーケン, Runāken): A moth demon, possessing a woman who tries to commit suicide as the result of a man's insensitivity. it remains dormant in it zombified host until the full moon, when its bloodlust is at its zenith. During the fight, Garo realizes that the host is nothing more than a puppet composed/filled with moths. The actual Lunarken is the orb like weapon the puppet uses in its attacks. Lunarken is portrayed by Emi Kitagawa (北川 絵美, Kitagawa Emi).
- Utoque (ウトック, Utokku): A corpse-like Horror that appears in a graveyard and possesses the body of a middle-aged prostitute named Kotomi Himigawa (氷見川 琴美, Himigawa Kotomi), making her young again and giving her a beautiful body. In return, Kotomi uses her beauty to lure men for the Horror to devour, using the eyes as a medium to suck the life out of the victim's body before he explodes. In battle, she could launch graveyard tombs to attack Kouga & Rei before Utoque takes over. Once Utoque is killed by Garo, Kotomi is fatally wounded, and begs for help. But Garo states that she is already dead because she has allowed the Horror to possess her in the first place, and her body soon disintegrates. Kotomi is portrayed by Nao Oikawa (及川 奈央, Oikawa Nao), while her original form is portrayed by Yoshie Uehara (上原 由恵, Uehara Yoshie).
- Moloch (モロク, Moroku; 8, 21): A Horror that is attracted to the sadness of Miri Kamisugawa (神須川 美理, Kamisugawa Miri), a woman who killed six young men and collected their fingers after her pianist boyfriend committed suicide for being robbed of his dream. The Horror rapes/possesses her, using her intent to kill a remaining four men for their fingers while eating the rest. In its true-form, Moloch's body is two-toned (flaming on the left, icy on the right) with control over the elements of ice and fire, launching its hands to attack its enemies or kill its victims. Garo kills Moloch, with only the ring Miri had from her boyfriend remaining. Later the father of Miri, Yūki Kamisugawa (神須川 祐樹, Kamisugawa Yūki) obtains the ring, along with the Horror's essence dagger and special bullets forged from other purified blades. Intent on revenge for his daughter, Yūki uses the bullets to create a pack of Horrors to help him kill Kouga. But after they are all killed, and he is denied death, Yūki stabs himself and became Moloch's new host. However, Yūki feels the pain that his daughter suffered and has Garo end his misery before the demon fully consumes him. Miri is portrayed by Erika (エリカ), while Yūki is portrayed by Reo Morimoto (森本 レオ, Morimoto Reo).
- Humpty (ハンプティ, Hanputi): A Horror that manifests from construction rubble to become a giant with strong armored body that seems invulnerable to the Garouken. Garo manages to kill it with the aid of Gōten and the Garou Zanbaken.
- Asmodai (アスモディ, Asumodi): A clown-like Horror that possesses the body of an unnamed clown. Using the red nose and its puppets, Asmodai forces its victims to show "their nature", turning them against each other in a fight to the death, while laughing all the way. Once they are dead, it turns them into beach balls to ingest. It is giant-sized in his true form, using its arms for locomotion. Though its attempts to con Garo out of similar ideologies, it is killed when Zero lops off its red nose. The clown is portrayed by Yuji Nakamura (中村 有志, Nakamura Yūji).
- Dantarian (ダンタリアン): A neon-green stag beetle Horror that possesses a con artist gambler named Reijirō Kunugi (椚 礼次郎, Kunugi Reijirō), tricking people to play a fixed coin game and after they lost, sealed their souls inside a coin. After its takes Kaoru, it brings Kouga into its alternate realm with three games of chance to save Kaoru's soul. After the third, Dantarian assumes its true form out of rage to lower itself to physical combat and is defeated by Garo. However, the Horror sets up a final challenge for Kouga upon its death that Kouga manages to succeed. Kunugi is portrayed by Jay Kabira (川平 慈英, Kabira Jei).
- Noul (ノウル, Nōru): A Horror that appeared during Taiga's time as Garo. Possessing the body of an old toymaker (おもちゃおじさん, omocha ojisan), he befriended Kouga whom he used as a shield to protect himself from Taiga, but Taiga mortally wounded the host so that the Horror ripped itself out, resembling a reddish version of its original form, in an attempt to kill Taiga. It was from that ordeal that Kouga understood the treacherous nature of a Horror. The old toymaker is portrayed by Zenjiro (ぜんじろう, Zenjirō).
- Vuel (ヴエル, Vueru): A Horror that possessed a vehicle.
- Gargoyle (ガーゴイル, Gāgoiru): A Horror that takes the body of Kōhei Kuramachi (倉町 公平, Kuramachi Kōhei), a sculptor who sold his soul to the "devil" to possess the "Hands of God" so he could create the ideal sculpture. Using his "gift", Kuramachi creates voodoo sculptures to torture his victims (young women) to death before sucking them down face first. He attempts to kill Kaoru when she hopes to learn more of her father through him, as she thinks Kuramachi had met her father. However, she finds out Kuramachi actually never met Yūji Mitsuki and was only inspired by his work. Gargoyle is killed by Zero, with a dying Kuramachi in awe of finally finding his "ideal piece" just before Zero kills him. Kuramachi is portrayed by Itsuji Itao (板尾 創路, Itao Itsuji).
- Haru (ハル): A Horror that possesses a fish, its uses a shut-in programmer Mitsuru Tonuma (戸沼 充, Tonuma Mitsuru) whom its befriends to get its prey, killing women dumped into its tank and taking their attributes to become more human and move about on land without trouble. Tonuma is about to feed Kaoru to Haru as the final victim when Kouga arrives and exposes Haru, and kills the weakened monster, much to Tonuma's dismay. Though tempted to kill Tonuma, Kouga manages to control his anger and only knocks him unconscious. Haru's final words, how Kouga uses Kaoru to get to her, causes a rift between Kaoru and Kouga. Haru's human form is portrayed by miko.
- 12-piece Fusion Giant Horror (12体融合巨大ホラー, Jūnitai Yūgō Kyodai Horā): A Horror born from the twelve purified blades containing the invading Horrors Kouga and Rei defeated. Much larger than others, Garo and Zero are unable to defeat it. In the end, the monster is killed/absorbed by Barago.
- Bonafaltz (ボナファルツ, Bonafarutsu): A skeleton gunman, created from Tochino (栩野), a security guard for a museum owned by Yuki Kamisugawa, using one of the special bullets made from Horror essences provided by the Watchdogs, in his attempt to avenge his daughter's death on Kouga. Tochino is portrayed by Yukitomo Tochino (栩野 幸知, Tochino Yukitomo).

== Byakuya no Maju ==
Garo Special: Byakuya no Maju features new types of Horrors and dark forces.

=== Eruzu ===
Eruzu (エルズ) is an arachnid Horror that possesses a young girl, using its host to target aggressive men. Its abilities, other than spider-related powers, include each surviving piece of its body being able to regenerate into a new Horror. This power means that Garo cannot simply cut it down and has to burn it, using his Blazing Armament technique.

=== Legules ===
Legules (レギュレイス, Regyureisu) is a Horror that has existed for over 1,000 years. The Makai community has no recorded history and his movements have no records. One thousand years ago during a solar eclipse, Legules successfully crossed through the barrier between worlds and revived his followers known as the Legules Family. Many Makai Knights and Makai Priests died that day in order to suppress the Horrors that Legules unleashed on humanity. To make sure that the catastrophe would never happen again, the Makai Priests created the Phosphorus Arrow to destroy the barrier and seal away Legules. One thousand years later, Legules manages to find another gateway to return to the human realm by assimilating a dead body to make it his own. Legules is not the usual variety of Horror, as he is seemingly demi-human and possessing elementals similar to Oni or Yokai.

He quickly begins building forces of his own by converting Horrors and a human into "his family". He then attacks Kantai during the night to find the Phosphorus Arrow so that he can complete his task of reviving his family. He tries to convert everyone, including the Madōgu of each Makai Knight, to join his forces. Tsubasa's Madōgu Goruba somehow gets possessed and Legules controls his bracelet body. When the night raid fails, he transfers himself into Goruba during the day and comes when people least suspect anything wrong. Legules takes the arrow and Rin Yamagatana with him, as he needs her blood to activate the arrow.

Legules's capabilities include, and are not limited to, bodily assimilation, dark magic, immunity to regular physical attacks, human energy absorption, body transference, martial arts, ultra human strength, ultra healing, body parts that can move without attachment, and biological transfiguration. Once the eclipse begins, Legules transformed himself into his true form, a giant metallic skeleton-like Horror. In this form, he is able to transform into a bladed metal wasp. Legules is defeated when Garo throws the Phosphorus Arrow into him and destroys the barrier at the same time. With Legules destroyed, the demon family vanishes.

Legules is portrayed by Mizuho Yoshida (吉田 瑞穂, Yoshida Mizuho) and is voiced by Hirose Masashi (広瀬 正志, Hirose Masashi).

=== Aomushi ===
Aomushi (アオムシ) is a murderer who is trying to dispose of a body that Legules takes over. Aomushi is given the chance to live by becoming a servant to him. Legules fires demonic energies from his eyes to the man's eyes, transforming Aomushi into a member of the Legules Family. Though not possessed, Aomushi counts as a Horror because he serves as an extension of Legules like those he converts. His capabilities are cloaking and being acrobatic. He eventually suffers a severe injury in combat from Tsubasa and Legules finishes him off as he has no use for him, reverting Aomushi to his original form.

Aomushi is portrayed by Namihei Koshige (こしげ なみへい, Koshige Namihei) and is voiced by Keiichiro Satomi (里見 圭一郎, Satomi Keiichirō).

=== Karakuri ===
Karakuri (カラクリ) are Horrors that are changed by Legules. Legules carries with him demonic masks and transforms live Horrors into his Legules family foot soldiers. Just like regular Horrors, they are able to enter humans and take control of them. However, they seem to be unable to blend in naturally as the regular Horrors can behave like a normal person. Their movements are very mechanical and move almost like karakuri puppets. They have high regenerative capabilities, bladed weapons as arms, and seem to have a ninja-like combat method. Their combat potential and strength is not above a regular Horror, but Horrors act independently as these Horrors serve a master. They do not speak, but merely make sounds and shift their eye sockets up and down as they react to their environment. Their body parts are known to function on their own even though if dismembered. They are all destroyed as the result of Legules's death.

== Red Requiem ==
Garo: Red Requiem features two of Apostle Horrors (使徒ホラー, Shito Horā), (Note: In the book GARO - Red Requiem - Makai no Sho R, it is revealed that the other five Apostle Horrors are Demon Dust Horror Daroda (魔塵ホラー ダロダ, Majin Horā Daroda), Demon Thunder Horror Bakugi (魔雷ホラー バクギ, Marai Horā Bakugi), Demon Paper Horror Pulc (魔紙ホラー パルク, Mashi Horā Paruku), Demon Needle Horror Nedle (魔針ホラー ニドル, Mashin Horā Nidoru), and Demon Sound Horror Unizo (魔音ホラー ユニゾ, Maon Horā Yunizo), and the seven Apostle Horrors were destroyed in two months by Kouga Saejima.) the generic name for seven powerful Horrors who are near equal to Messiah, and their followers.

=== Karma ===
Karma (カルマ, Karuma) is a Demon Mirror Horror (魔鏡ホラー, Makyō Horā) and one of the Apostle Horrors who lives in a mirror rather than human hosts, though she can turn a human into a Horror familiar if their darkness is great enough. She consumes human souls by showing illusions of their greatest desires, drawing them into her mirror realm and turning their bodies into piles of broken mirror shards to ingest with their souls trapped in the mirror world. Among her victims are untold numbers of Makai Knights who came to slay her, only to be defeated and devoured. Karma is able to jump from mirror to mirror if the one she is currently housed in is destroyed. The sorrows and hatreds of people consumed by her are used for her as childlike Warashi (ワラシ) and the shadowy Mercenaries of the Demon Mirror (魔鏡の傭兵, Makyō no yōhei). Eventually, forced to fight Garo, Karma assumes a giant mirror-shard themed harpy form while trying to convince Garo to swear loyalty to her in return for immortality. However, empowered by the fallen Makai Knights' souls within the realm, Garo destroys Karma.

Karma is portrayed by Saori Hara (原 紗央莉, Hara Saori) and is voiced by Mika Hijii (肘井 美佳, Hijii Mika).

=== Babel ===
Babel (ベビル, Bebiru) is a Demon Tower Horror (魔塔ホラー, Matō Horā) and one of the Apostle Horrors, a gigantic bull-like beast with a large headpiece resembling a guillotine with a blindfolded, naked human female form mounted on its front. The blade of the headpiece, tethered by the chains running through the Horror's body, can be launched. Unlike other Horrors, Babel is a cannibal and feeds on its own kind, posing as an infant in a carriage before being found out and destroyed by Garo.

=== Kurusu ===
Kurusu (クルス) is a Horror under Karma. Originally an elderly painter named Kenichi Kurusu (来栖 謙一, Kurusu Ken'ichi), Kurusu was driven mad by the death of his lover, Shion. He eventually snaps and kills a girl he was using as a model for a painting, trying to emulate Shion onto her. Karma, hearing his anguish, transforms him into a Horror, restoring his youth, and revives the said girl's corpse in Shion's image. In his human form, Kurusu fights with a large sword, holding it in a reverse grip. His Horror form is a large, skeletal creature composed half of bone and half of a fleshy substance. Finding Shion dead, Kurusu goes after the Kouga and Rekka while refusing to accept his love for the girl is a lie before being destroyed by Garo.

Kurusu is portrayed by Shinji Kasahara (笠原 紳司, Kasahara Shinji), his original form portrayed by Akira Nakao (中尾 彬, Nakao Akira).

=== Shion ===
Shion (シオン) is a Horror under Karma. In reality, she is a Horror created from the corpse of a girl Kurusu murdered prior to his transformation and altered to resemble the real Shion who died long ago. Her Horror form is not monstrous like most, only possessing a single white wing and an angelic outfit. She is killed by Rekka, her body lasting long enough for Kurusu to find before it dissolves into feathers.

Shion is portrayed by Hiromi Eguchi (江口 ヒロミ, Eguchi Hiromi).

=== Baul ===
Baul (バウル, Bauru) is a Horror that possesses the body of a woman and carries around the Apostle Horror Babel. Baul is killed by Rekka.

The possessed woman is portrayed by Aya Kumeta (久米田 彩, Kumeta Aya).

== Kiba ==
These are the Horrors that appeared in Kiba Gaiden.

=== Garius and Blade ===
Garius (ガリウス, Gariusu) and Blade (ブレイド, Bureido) are two Horrors that were among the many that were absorbed by Kiba. While Garius is a serpentine flyer, Blade is a giant mantis-like monster.

== Kokuryū ==
Kokuryū (哭竜) is a dragon-like Horror that exists within the mind of Barago in Kiba Gaiden and exists in a space produced by Sigma Fudō in Makai Senki.

== Gyanon ==
Gyanon (戯阿音(ギャノン)) is one of strongest Horrors in existence, labeled as Messiah's Fang (メシアの牙, Meshia no Kiba) and the Ancient Red Demon Beast (太古の赤き魔獣, Taiko no Akaki Majū). Having seemingly died, the Makai Senate sent a group of three Makai Knights and one Makai Guide to retrieve the monster's corpse from Amber Rock Valley. However, Barago also sought the Horror and Gyanon was nowhere to be found by either party. It is revealed in Makai Senki, that Sigma Fudō had stolen Gyanon as he intends to utilize the Horror in powering up his Magōryū Idea while reviving the fiend with large numbers of human sacrifices. To achieve this goal, Sigma obtains the pelt of a Spirit Beast to ensure the revived Gyanon is under his complete control while infusing Kouga's body and soul into the Horror to complete his resurrection. Though Kouga is freed, Gyanon awakens after Idea's creation in response to Sigma's darkness, devouring him and assimilating the ultimate Gōryū while assuming his androgynous human-like form. While telling Garo that his resurrection was unplanned, Gyanon intends to take advantage to bring all Horrors into the human world. However, Idea is destroyed with the Makai Knights and Madou Priests joining forces with Gyanon reduced to a head as Garo destroys the bodiless Horror.

Gyanon is portrayed by Peter (ピーター, Pītā).

== Makai Senki ==
These are the Horrors that appear in Garo: Makai Senki.

- Cigarein (シガレイン, Shigarein): A tricky Cigarette Horror (煙草ホラー, Tabako Horā) that inhabits an antique cigarette lighter owned by a murderous military officer, his method of feeding being to invoke internal combustion in his victims and swallow the airborne ashes. Cigarien's lighter eventually ends up in the possession of Eiichi Anan (阿南 英一, Anan Eiichi), a petty crook who makes an enemy out of a mob boss named Katagiri by stealing his money. Making Anan an offer to save him in return for his soul, Cigarein possesses the man before slaughtering Katagiri and his entourage. Cigarein then proceeds to devour those who are considered to be scum of society before being found by Kouga. Though he repeatedly tries to weasel out of his fight with Kouga, Cigarein is forced to assume his true war-themed armored form before Garo cuts him down. Anan's soul endures a bit before Garo stabs the soul into oblivion. Anan is portrayed by Naoto Takenaka (竹中 直人, Takenaka Naoto).
- Luzagin (ルーザギン, Rūzagin): A Streetlight Horror (街灯ホラー, Gaitō Horā) that inhabits a streetlight in an area once used for unsavory executions, able to use heat and light in her attacks. Luzagin possesses the body of Shino Ichikai (一貝 志乃, Ichikai Shino), a vain yet dirty homeless woman who desires handsome men to the point of murdering them so she can have them. Acting on Ichikai's desires, Luzagin goes to captures ideal men, mutilating their bodies before freeze-drying them to add to her collection. However, she has strict physical requirements on who makes it to her collection, and devours through their shadows those who do not "pass". She eventually fights Kouga, forced to assume her true form before being cut down and left to die from the fatal wound. Ichikai is portrayed by Reona Hirota (広田 レオナ, Hirota Reona).
- Melgis (メルギス, Merugisu): A Horror that is terrorizing the road by murdering those who travel through a tunnel. He is destroyed by Reo with the Gōryū Colt.
- Evil Wheel Gōryū (邪輪号竜, Jarin Gōryū): Reo's Gōryū Colt which he uses to destroy the Horror Melgis. However, wounded during the fight, some of Reo's blood ends up on Colt and awakens its Horror-based instinct as it possesses a motorcycle and enhances it with multiple weapons. Eventually, Garo manages to destroy the Horror core and forces Colt out of the motorcycle.
- Genojika (ゲノジカ): A bird-based Horror that possesses the body of a gambler named Kid (キッド, Kiddo), using his host to invite various gamblers to an underground casino on an island maintained by his Horror familiars. There, he has the gamblers play a life-and-death poker game where he uses his Joker card to send his victims into a limbo, where he can eat at his leisure along with those dear to the victim if they borrow chips from the house. However, posing as one of the guests, Kouga destroys the Joker card to release those among the victims still living and then the Horror himself. Kid is portrayed by Kohei Murakami (村上 幸平, Murakami Kōhei).
- Death Hole (デスホール, Desu Hōru): (Note: In the ending credits, it is credited as Terubo (テルボ).) A venus flytrap-headed Gate Horror (ゲートホラー, Gēto Horā) that emerges from a gate that manifests from a manhole cover which was manufactured by Kōji Kijima (黄島 宏二, Kijima Kōji), an artistic metal caster who left his wife Mayumi (真弓) to die under a manhole prior to the cover's creation. Possessing the body of a woman, and converting her host into the shaded woman in black, Death Hole uses Kijima to mass-produce more of the manhole covers to bring more of her kin into the world. However, while Death Hole meets her end against Garo, Kijima faces his own horrific end at the hands of his wife's specter. Kijima is portrayed by Takeshi Nadagi (なだぎ 武, Nadagi Takeshi), while the woman in black is portrayed by Hiromi Eguchi.
- Erinnerung (エリンネルグ, Erinnerugu): (Note: In the ending credits, it has a subtitle of Makai Tree.) A Horror that inhabits a tree which Osamu Shōnai (庄内 治, Shōnai Osamu) and his wife Naoe (直恵) grew from a seed that they found among the belongings of their son Masato (眞人), a wartime photographer who was killed in action. The two proceed to invite people who pass by into their house for a meal. They then poison their guests and bury them under the tree which casts an illusion of "Masato" under the moonlight which acts on the couple's stronger memory of him. Rei is invited for dinner and later poisoned as well. However, immune to poison, Rei confronts Erinnerung as it personally attacks him and kills the Horror with the couple heartbroken. Erinnerung is voiced by Yukari Okuda (奥田 ゆかり, Okuda Yukari).
- Rebecca (レベッカ, Rebekka): A Horror that possesses the body of a security guard before being slain by Zero.
- Kagemitsu (カゲミツ): A Horror that inhabits a katana, originally owned by a man named Ukyō (右京) who was turned into a Horror familiar. But one day, a skilled swordsman named Igari Jūzō (猪狩 重蔵) finds Ukyō and cuts him down. Having seen a Makai Knight in his youth, yet unaware of his identity, Jūzō had made it his life's goal to search for an opponent like that figure. But suffering from an illness and have little time left to live, Jūzō accepts Kagemitsu's offer of a second chance in life in return to give him the blood of living people. It takes the Horror several centuries to heal Jūzō, placing the samurai in suspended animation before reviving him in the modern era. However, as he follows bushidō, Jūzō is disappointed that he cannot find someone strong to fight with until he finds Rei by chance and challenges him. But as Kagemistu refuses to allow him to use the sword until he draws blood, Jūzō is forced to fight Rei with makeshift bokkens made from broomsticks. The duel cannot be truly concluded as Jūzō's symptoms resurface and Rei admits defeat, with Jūzō learning fully of the Makai Knights from Kagemitsu as the Horror demands blood if the human wants his help to maintain his health as well as using his sword. Still refusing to cut any innocent down to honor his pact, Jūzō commits seppuku instead to quench the blade's thirst, along with absorbing the horrified Kagemitsu, becoming his host. Surprisingly, as noted by Silva, Jūzō remains in control of his body as he forces Rei to resume their duel as Horror and Makai Knight, though Rei sees that the samurai had potential to become a Makai Knight, due to the surprising fact of being able to pick up one of Rei's swords without trouble despite having never touched Soul Metal before. Jūzō is eventually slain, dying with satisfaction that he was defeated by the blade of one stronger than him. But learning of Kouga as an even stronger fighter, Jūzō hands Rei his wakizashi before turning into ash. Igari is portrayed by Kohei Otomo (大友 康平, Ōtomo Kōhei) and Kagemitsu is voiced by Rintarō Nishi (西 凛太朗, Nishi Rintarō).
- Agturus (アグトゥルス, Aguturusu): A Horror that inhabits a makeup box, altering appearances to whatever suits him. Agturus possesses the body of Ryūnosuke Takamine (高峯 龍之介, Takamine Ryūnosuke), an aged frail janitor at a theater who was once a star stage actor in the play The Sword of Arcite. His frustration over a flamboyant actor ruining the play as the lead attracts the Horror. After being possessed with his youth restored, Ryūnosuke devours the other actor and takes the stage for his own. Kouga eventually buys all the tickets to one of his plays one night to have a showdown with him, eventually cutting him down. Takamine is portrayed by Mayo Kawasaki (川崎 麻世, Kawasaki Mayo).
- Zuformer (ズフォーマー, Zufōmā): A serpentine Furious Sky Horror (烈空ホラー, Rekkū Horā) that flies at fast speeds. Sent to kill it, Kouga is forced to wait the Horror out before slaying it.
- Yashaul (ヤシャウル, Yashauru): A Horror that appears at the site of a traffic accident where she possesses the nearby dead body of Toshiko Hoshikawa (星川 敏子, Hoshikawa Toshiko), a pâtissière who was forcing her daughter Misao (ミサオ) to follow in her footsteps. When Misao attempts to commit suicide to escape the pressure, Toshiko sacrifices herself to stop her daughter prior to being possessed. Using Toshiko's body, Yashual assumes her host's identity and uses Misao's guilt to manipulate her. The Horror is eventually found and slain by Rei, though the deed pained him a bit as he is forced to leave Misao heartbroken. Toshiko is portrayed by Yōko Ishino (いしの ようこ, Ishino Yōko), while Misao is portrayed by Nako Mizusawa (水沢 奈子, Mizusawa Nako).
- Raizon (ライゾン): A Horror from Kouga's childhood, who devoured the friends he made during his training under Wataru Shijima. In the present day, Kouga crosses paths with Raizon and avenges his friends' deaths by slaying Raizon personally. In Gold Storm Sho, a Raizon appeared in the flashback of Jinga's story.
- Sedinbale (セディンベイル, Sedinbeiru): An ancient Horror who can use word characters in her abilities and attacks, using printed words as gates. Due to her vast Makai-related knowledge, Sedinbale is sealed with a Madō Book instead of being destroyed so Makai Priests can gain access to her knowledge. However, breaking Sedinbale's seal, the red-masked man has the Horror help him translate the old Makai script in his possession before allowing the Horror to act on her whim. Being pursued by Rekka and Kouga, Sedinbale takes the body of a young woman who surrounds herself in depraved words before targeting Kaoru. Revealing Kouga's condition with Kaoru present, Sedinbale battles Garo and Rekka before they manage to rip the main character from the Horror's body and seal it into a Madō Book. The possessed woman is portrayed by Asami.

== Yami o Terasu Mono ==
- Bride (花嫁, Hanayome): Portrayed by Miku Sano (佐野 光来, Sano Miku).
- Palkeira (パルケイラ, Parukeira): A large Horror that can uses its brute strength and scorpion tail tongues to attack an opponent. During the events of Yami o Terasu Mono, a Palkeira in Vol City over gorged on humans and was trapped underground, using one of its two disembodied hands into a naked woman as an effective lure before it was destroyed by the Makai Knights. The naked woman is portrayed by Yukiko Suoh (周防 ゆきこ, Suō Yukiko).
- Danda (壇田; 4, 5): A man who becomes the vessel of a Horror that emerges from a radio. Danda is portrayed by Namihei Koshige.
- Yuya (ユーヤ, Yūya): An overweight Horror who is normally weak until exposure to Shin's music gives him a power boost. Portrayed by Katsuya (勝矢)
- Man (8): Portrayed by Makoto Ito (伊藤 慎, Itō Makoto).
- Miho Toyama (遠山 未歩, Tōyama Miho): A teacher who became the vessel of a Horror that devours students periodically, sparing only those she considers promising. However, Ms. Toyama is forced to consume Haruka Kitajima and her family when the girl witnesses her true form. With the aid of Haruka's classmate Hiroki Tsuboi, Ryuga slays Ms. Toyama with her death covered up. Portrayed by Nao Nagasawa (長澤 奈央, Nagasawa Nao).
- Boara (菩阿羅): A Horror in the service of the Kaneshiro Group who is based at the nightclub Paradaice. Able to read the minds of others and assume the form of what they desire, Boara lulls her victims into a moment of weakness and turns them into a vapor she consumes. Her victims are mostly men who the Kaneshiro Group are disposing of before Ryuga and Rian destroy Boara and her business. Portrayed by Nao Oikawa, while her naked young woman, mature woman, and plump woman forms are portrayed by Mana Sakura (紗倉 まな, Sakura Mana), Kyoko Hayami (速水 今日子, Hayami Kyōko), and Naru Nashio (なしお 成, Nashio Naru).
- Maki (万樹): A violinist who became the vessel of a Horror that devoured an opera singer before being found and killed by Takeru and Aguri. Portrayed by Hirotsugu Imamura (今村 浩継, Imamura Hirotsugu).
- Karen (華漣): Tousei Kaneshiro's mother, a fallen Makai Priestess who was left to care for her child after her lover Kensui Kaneshiro abandoned them. Becoming a Vol City resident, Karen raised Tousei to believe that he is destined for greater things. However, while entertaining her guests, Karen ends up being possessed by a Horror that her teenage son deliberately summoned into their home. Portrayed by Makoto Togashi (冨樫 真, Togashi Makoto).

=== Madō Horrors ===
"Madō Horrors" (魔導ホラー, Madō Horā; "Heretic Horrors") are a unique form of Horror first created by Zedom by infusing human bodies with Horror Seeds, which germinate into Madō Horror Plants that spread across the body. As a result, unlike regular Horrors, Madō Horrors are born directly within the bodies of humans regardless if they have an innate darkness or not, willing or otherwise. Though bound ultimately to serve Zedom, Madō Horrors also answer to anyone who sires them as loyal servants in Zedom's absence. The personality of the sired human is retained to an extent, but warped in a way to suit to its master's needs, allowing Madō Horrors to adapt more easily than Inga Horrors with the need to feed a secondary priority. The need varies from one person to another, some might feed constantly while others only do so when they need to fight better or heal damage. Due to their fundamentally different nature from Inga Horrors, they are capable of hiding from the usual means of Horror detection, with Makai Knights and Makai Priests forced to use investigative deduction to hunt Madō Horrors before developing a specific device that exposes a Madō Horror's red eyes and lined face markings to confirm their identity. Unlike most Inga Horrors that devour human bodies, Madō Horrors rip the soul off a human and devour it with the body turning to dust. In a fight, Madō Horrors can create weapons from parts of their bodies and are stronger than Inga Horrors. The process of Madō Horrors being sired varies on their inner strength, which can be quickened to a certain extent with Zedom's Requiem. Due to the possibility of being sired without consciously knowing it, the turned humans can be blissfully unaware of the transformation until their powers and nature awaken by their first feeding. Ultimately, because of their origins as innocents, a Madō Horror is as much a victim as those they consume.

During the events of Yami o Terasu Mono, Tousei creates his Madō Horror minions, using them to create a shadow empire within Vol City, from the Madō Horror Plants resulting from forcing Hakana to germinate Madō Horror Plants from the Zedom Seeds, seeded within her by accident from Zedom's Arm. However, Hakana altered the batch of Madō Horror Plants inside her for the purpose of restoring the Garo armor. As a result of singing enhancing them and the armor's restoration, these stronger Madō Horrors can only be slain by one bearing the title of Garo. However, other than Ryuga seeing Hakana's memories, there is adverse effect from killing these Madō Horrors one by one as the armor temporary regains its glow while rendering it unwearable for the moment. It was when all Madō Horrors in the city were slain that the Garo armor was restored to its original state.

- Masahiko Washizu (鷲頭 正彦, Washizu Masahiko): The manager of Kaneshiro Real Estate, tending to only use his Horror powers whenever dealing with someone proves to be a hassle. Though slain by Ryuga, a scale from Washizu's body ends up in the possession of a youth named Shin who used it as a guitar pick before Ryuga destroys it. Portrayed by Junichi Haruta (春田 純一, Haruta Jun'ichi).
- Hideyuki Shiranami (白波 秀行, Shiranami Hideyuki): The manager of Vol City's Immigration Bureau who desires to make others happy, bringing people accepted by the city to a manor in Vol City's Dream Garden Hills community where they are devoured by the Horrors residing there. Shiranami almost fed the Suzuki family to his familiars before the Makai Knights intervening with Ryuga and Takeru slaying the Horror. Portrayed by Kenji Mizuhashi (水橋 研二, Mizuhashi Kenji).
- Tsumazaki (妻崎): The manager of Kaneshiro Foods' factory with a warped work mentality, Tsumazaki is tasked to develop a method by his kin where human souls can be stored within capsules to be ingested later. Wounded by Aguri, Tsumazaki is slain by Garo. Portrayed by Hideaki Kusaka (日下 秀昭, Kusaka Hideaki).
- Councilor: A Vol City councilor and the first of the Madō Horrors to be hunted down after the development of the Madō Horror Detector. Though Aguri's arrows had no effect on him, the Councilor is decapitated by Garo before being finally destroyed. Portrayed by Yoshinori Okamoto (岡本 美登, Okamoto Yoshinori).
- Doctor: A doctor of Vol City's central hospital, he is slain by Garo when he fell into a trap that he, Rian, and Takeru set up. Portrayed by Yujiro Komura (小村 裕次郎, Komura Yūjirō).
- Hyena (ハイエナ, Haiena): Originally known as Kaga Kaneshiro, he worked as a psychologist in the eastern district before being turned into a Madō Horror by his brother Tousei and rendered mute for being a blabbermouth. Forced to flee to the graveyard after being stripped of his ability to speak, Kaga came to be known as the deranged grave keeper Hyena due to being forced to feed on remnant human souls to survive. Hyena also becomes one of Vol City's urban legends as those who see him were said to fall ill in three days and die three days later. When Ryuga and Rian found him, with the latter restoring his voice, Hyena acts as a pervert to get Ryuga alone while lying of wanting to be human again. From there, revealing Zedom while hiding his true identity and that of his brother as the Madō Horrors' leader, Hyena sends Aguri and Takeru on suicide missions while managing to trick and restrain Ryuga. However, tricking Hyena at the last second, Ryuga dons the Garo armor and slays the Madō Horror. Hyena is portrayed by Dankan (ダンカン).

=== Zedom ===
Zedom (ゼドム, Zedomu) is an Ancient Horror, labeled as the Battle Commander of Slaughter (殺戮の闘将, Satsuriku no Tōshō), whose body is composed of various blocks and alter themselves into weapons. Zedom created the first Madō Horrors in order to create the most powerful Horror army to conquer the world. However, Zedom is defeated by the Makai Priests of old with his body broken into pieces and each part sealed at various locations, with his head buried under the site of Vol City with the Goddess Statue erected, through the sacrifice of large numbers of Makai Priests, to keep the Horror imprisoned. The seeds from his body parts that were used to create Madō Horrors were entrusted to the Makai Priests who sealed the Horror, with two Makai Priestesses enacting a ritual where they open the Hill of Zedom's Arm's seals long enough to painfully absorb a Zedom seed, and grow a Madō Horror Plant from which Soul Metal is developed from. Though sealed, Zedom retained consciousness and witnessed the Makai Knights' birth, resulted in his resentment of the Makai Order for using his body parts to develop weapons used against his kind.

Due to Tousei's actions fifteen years prior, Zedom's arm briefly emerged from the corrupted seal it was trapped in, infusing Hakana with more seeds than initially intended and knocked her out. When he attempts to harvest a new supply of seeds from the Horror's head for Rian to absorb, Tousei ends up awakening Zedom when one of the seeds accidentally falls back into the seal. As a result, Zedom begins to destroy the Goddess Statue in order to break free from his prison while having Sonshi acquire a Makai Knight to serve as his new body. Taking the lifeless Sonshi after he was killed as a vessel and altering it into a militant dressed form, Zedom attempts to recruit the Makai Knights in serving him before resolving to remake the world in his image. Although he is incredibly powerful, Zedom inadvertently created a weak spot within himself when he destroyed Burai, who offered to serve as a host to stop the Horror. Further weakened by a special arrow fired by Aguri into the said spot, Zedom is slain by the combined effort of the Makai Knights under the Garo armor's influence.

Zedom is portrayed by Makoto Otake (大竹 まこと, Ōtake Makoto).

== Zero: Black Blood ==
=== Ring ===
Ring (リング, Ringu) is a powerful skeletal and anthropomorphic bird-like Horror who is the main antagonist of Zero: Black Blood, appearing in the form of a handsome European gentleman dressed immaculately and predominantly in a white suit. Unlike most of his kind, though he considers humanity very selfish, Ring actually plans to have co-existence between his kind with humans as an improvement to how his kind normally feed, believing that doing so will bring lasting peace to both humans and Horrors. Ring begins this agenda by establishing a community where he offers sanctuary to humans escaping from reality. His only condition for someone to be accepted into the community is to undergo a monthly lottery, where there is a 2% chance that one of them would ingest a pill containing crystallized Horror blood to become a Blood Dolce (血のドルチェ, Chi no Doruche) for his fellow Horrors to feed on. Ring's plan also relied on Iyu's calming singing ability, having also fallen in love with her to the point of obsession as it allowed him to maintain his sense of self, and keeping the humans serene and indifferent to the arrangement. Though Ring usually opts to settle things peacefully instead of resorting to violence, he is a powerful Horror who can transform his feathers into various weapons. In a state of rage however, Ring reverts to his colossal true form where he loses control over his Horror instincts unless Iyu sings to him. After devouring Iyu when she refuses to sing for him any longer, Ring is eventually slain by Zero with help from Yuna.

Ring is portrayed by Thane Camus (セイン・カミュ, Sein Kamyu).

== Makai no Hana ==
- Succubus (サキュバス, Sakyubasu): A Horror resembling a Venus flytrap that emerged from a pair of pruning shears which belong to Erina Tokiwa (常盤 エリナ, Tokiwa Erina), an ikebana artist who currently creates works with the theme of death. Dissatisfied with her current works, Erina commits acts of murder to get to higher stages of her art, which causes her to be possessed. Allowed to maintain her sense of self in the possession, Erina acts on her desire to create art from victims by petrifying them for her art, her new mannequins sprouting flowers whose petals she consumes. Erina takes an interest in Mayuri and intended to make the girl into her masterpiece before Raiga intervened. Despite losing interest later due to realizing that Mayuri is but an object, she fights Raiga nonetheless due to him destroying her work. During the battle that followed, Succubus is slain by Raiga with Erina lasting long enough for the euphoria of her impending death to turn into utter dread. Erina is portrayed by Hinako Saeki (佐伯 日菜子, Saeki Hinako).
- Ilgishin (イルギシン, Irugishin): A Horror that emerged from an old horror film that is able to send people into illusionary worlds, possessing characteristics of various Horror movie characters that include Freddy Krueger, Leatherface, and Pinhead. Ilgishin possesses the body of Harima (ハリマ), a Horror film buff projectionist who allows the Horror to enter him so he can enact revenge on his manager for intending to close the movie theater down. Acting on Harima's passion, instead of feeding, Ilgishin places his victims in films to watch them get killed off by the film's monstrous antagonists. When Raiga refuses to play by his rules, Ilgishin personally battles the Makai Knight before being destroyed when Raiga uses his Makai Flame to burn him and his film away. Harima is portrayed by Kitaro (きたろう, Kitarō).
- Egosiren (エゴサイレーン, Egosairēn): A glass-based Horror that possesses the body of Shimada (シマダ), the owner of a wind chime shop who Raiga met as a child and taught him on how to make a wind chime - a memento which he has kept to the present day. However, after his son and apprentice Tetsuya died in a car crash, Shimada ended up becoming the host of Egosiren as he places pieces of his being into wind chimes that transform into ghostly women in kimono to devour buyers. When Raiga learns of this, he sees no other way to save Shimada other than slaying him. Shimada is portrayed by Hiroki Matsukata (松方 弘樹, Matsukata Hiroki), while the woman in kimono is portrayed by Kaori Tsubaki (椿 かおり, Tsubaki Kaori).
- Grimzora (グリムゾーラ, Gurimuzōra): A Horror that is Raiga's 100th slain Horror. The Horror makes a surprise attack on Raiga near the Tower of Heroic Spirits but ends up being slain by him.
- Delitus (デリィータス, Deryītasu): A giant Oni-faced Horror that takes the form of a traditional Japanese straw-thatched house with its core assuming the form of a patriarch Ichiro (イチロウ, Ichirō) and his family: his wife Mako (マコ) and their children Jiro (ジロウ, Jirō), Mami (マミ), Saburo (サブロウ, Saburō), Shiro (シロウ, Shirō), Mari (マリ), and Goro (ゴロウ, Gorō). Tricking people into entering their abode, the family makes the guest feel welcomed and joyful before tossing them into the empty communal pot in the center of the house to stew. From there, the house vanishes and appears at another unlikely location. Raiga arrives when they are about to cook their latest victim and is framed as a villain but shortly after, he reveals their deception. After being overwhelmed, Delitus assumes its true form with Raiga slaying the Horror with the help of Gōten. Ichiro is portrayed by Guts Ishimatsu (ガッツ石松, Gattsu Ishimatsu), while his family is portrayed by Yoko Oshima (大島 蓉子, Ōshima Yōko), Takuro Takahashi (高橋 卓郎, Takahashi Takurō), Yumi Yoshino (芳野 友美, Yoshino Yumi), Tsubasa Matsuzaki (松崎 飛翼, Matsuzaki Tsubasa), Fubomichi Takazawa (高澤 父母道, Takazawa Fubomichi), Aoi Ito (伊東 蒼, Itō Aoi), and Kotaro Fujitomi (藤冨 航太郎, Fujitomi Kōtarō).
- Lizary (リザリー, Rizarī): An insect-based Horror that emerged from the corpse of a woman that was raped and murdered by his host, a disturbed university student named Mikimoto (ミキモト) who is obsessed with insects and locked himself away in the Natural Science Club. As Lizary is a Horror that does not fully manifest after possessing a human body, Mikimoto is unaware of the possession with his perception altered to believe his unconscious feedings were the work of the woman's corpse, believing her to be a random person he found who is an insect in human form, and his subsequent victims to be molted forms of the said corpse. Eventually, after Mayuri unlocks Mikimoto's memories, a fully manifested Lizary takes over his host's body before being slain by the combined efforts of Raiga and Crow. Mikimoto is portrayed by Tokio Emoto (柄本 時生, Emoto Tokio).
- Caricatuan (カリカジュアン, Karikajuan): An ink-based Horror that emerged from a dip pen which belongs to Seiji Kawabata (カワバタ セイジ, Kawabata Seiji), a manga artist who has become shadowed by newer manga artists with his talent and renown slowly fading. Kawabata ends up becoming Caricatuan's host when he attempts to kill an assistant who is leaving and insulted him prior, using his new power to regain his former glory by turning his victims into manga caricatures that he eats to gain their talents. Though a barrier is created around his workshop which effectively hides his presence as a Horror, his actions in accidentally using ancient Makai script in the popular manga Makai King he created under Caricatuan's influence tips off Raiga and Mayuri. He uses manga images to fight the Makai Knight, and assumes that he will be victorious by scripting every single aspect of the battle up to Raiga's death. However, Caricatuan is slain when the last panel is blotched by Raiga. Kawabata lasts in human form just long enough to be praised by Mayuri for Ninja Rin, his first manga drawn during elementary school. Kawabata is portrayed by Masanori Ishii (石井 正則, Ishii Masanori).
- Profundes (プロファンデス, Purofandesu): A Horror whose eyes are located on the skull-shaped side of her head, Profundes is particularly detested by the Makai warriors, as her feeding methods require subjecting many victims at the same time to sheer terror and then drag them into the Demon World. Profundes possesses the body of Kiera (キエラ), an amusement park ride developer who wears a witch's outfit, and she uses her host's skills to develop a motion simulator that doubles as a portal to the Makai realm. Kiera succeeds in setting up an arrangement with the Okura company, but her feeding is thwarted by Raiga. Profundes battles him in the entrance to the Demon World before he slays her. Kiera is portrayed by Mao Miyaji (宮地 真緒, Miyaji Mao).
- Duoct (ドゥオクト, Duokuto): A mechanical Giant Figure Horror (巨偶ホラー, Kyogū Horā) that captures a pure-hearted human inside its body to serve as its power source, before going out to feed. After capturing a high school girl named Saki Mizuno (ミズノ サキ, Mizuno Saki) Duoct hunts humans together with a Horror familiar that assumes Saki's appearance. However, some of Saki's thoughts still leak to hold Duoct back, which is presumed as mechanical glitches from the outside. After the fake Saki is slain by Crow, Raiga pulls off a gambit to allow himself be captured by Duoct to destroy it from the inside while saving the real Saki, who is unconscious and has no memory of her time inside the Horror. Saki is portrayed by Sakina Kuwae (桑江 咲菜, Kuwae Sakina).

=== Ady Slate Horrors ===
In Garo: Makai no Hana, besides the run of the mill Inga Horrors, there are nine special Horrors used by Makai Priests in the foundation of Eyrith's sealing. Unlike common Horrors, having been exposed to Eyrith's power, their personalities are dominant over their human hosts to the point where they won't recognize people the humans had known. They cannot be sealed within Makai Blades when vanquished and their essence congeals into stones. Mayuri is sent by the Senate to seal these stones due her power to seal Horrors within her body, using them to reform the Ady Slate after Eyrith is defeated.

- Azdab (アズダブ, Azudabu): A fish-like Horror who is the first of the Ady Slate Horrors Raiga encounters. Upon his freedom, Azdab possesses the body of the museum security guard Sekiya (セキヤ) after sensing the human's inner darkness from having murdered a girl. From there, Azdab proceeds to scare his victims with his water-based body before manifesting a swarm of piranha to eat them alive. Ultimately, Azdab is not a particularly powerful fighter and is soon slain by Raiga with Mayuri sealing him once he congregates into a stone. Sekiya is portrayed by Yūki Himura (日村 勇紀, Himura Yūki).
- Exta (エクスタ, Ekusuta): A one-eyed spider-like Horror that once freed, assumed the form of a cat before possessing a shabby and old homeless woman after sensing her inner darkness. Altering her host to look youthful, Exta uses her power to assume the form of an object to ambush her prey. While she is a decent fighter, Exta mostly ran from Raiga and Crow before fighting the former in her true form before being sealed by Mayuri once congregated into a stone. The possessed woman is portrayed by Aki Hano (羽野 晶紀, Hano Aki).
- Stellas (ステラス, Suterasu): Stellas possesses the body of Luke (ルーク, Rūku), an English-speaking foreigner and serial killer who murders people because he claims that they are "his stars". Stellas is a flamboyant goofball who toys with his victims bilingually, and then turns his prey into stardust that he inhales. In his true form, Stellas is capable of flight and creating meteor-like Inga Stars. After being grounded by Crow's flight abilities, Stellas is slain by Raiga and then sealed by Mayuri once congregated into a stone. Luke is portrayed by Thane Camus.
- Granda (グランダ, Guranda): A mechanical spherical Horror able to turn invisible and create clones of itself. As Granda is a type of Horror whose upcoming location is confirmed despite the time of arrival a mystery, Raiga and Mayuri wait it out before the former slays it and sealed by the latter once congregated into a stone.
- Idora (イドラ): A holder of Eyrith's seed, possessing the body of a young woman to move about. Though Idora is slain by Raiga as Eyrith transfers into one of her fellow Ady Slate Horrors still active, her essence attempts to take advantage of Mayuri's weakening condition from opening her inner cage during the encounter with Barg to regain physical form. Luckily, Raiga uses a Makai spell to enter Mayuri's consciousness to metaphysically destroy Idora and save Mayuri. The possessed woman is portrayed by Haruka Ando (安藤 遥, Andō Haruka).
- Latel (ラテル, Rateru): Latel is a powerful Horror who seeks equally powerful opponents to devour. Latel first defeats the fallen Makai Knight Izumo (イズモ), Bikuu's younger brother, before possessing his body to go after another worthy opponent. This leads to Latel going after Raiga, only to be slain by Raiga after Bikuu targeted a weak point on her brother's body. Once Latel is reduced to a stone, Bikuu proceeds to purify what remained of Izumo's body. Izumo is portrayed by Sanshiro Wada (和田 三四郎, Wada Sanshirō).
- Abysscore (アビスコア, Abisukoa): Abysscore is a Horror who uses music to hypnotize his victims into a state of euphoria before converting them into cotton-candy like Life Scores. Possessing the body of a crazed conductor named Johann (ヨハン, Yohan), he goes on a feeding frenzy with the aid of his Makai March band before becoming bored with normal humans. This leads to Abysscore to target Raiga and Mayuri, only to be slain with Johann lasting long enough to praise the song of Raiga's soul. Johann is portrayed by Rolly.
- Gogeet (ゴギート, Gogīto): A bat-like sword-wielding Horror that is an eccentric sadist who possessed the body of a young man named Matō (マトウ) and prefers to toy with his victims, before devouring them. While he normally eats humans, Gogeet can devour other Horrors as well, despite not liking it much. After becoming the host of Eyrith's seed, Gogeet gains the ability to create an illusion of his first victim: a little girl that he devoured in front of her father. Gogeet calls the illusion "Ai" and refers to her as his daughter to put Raiga at a disadvantage. But after losing his ability, Gogeet gloats the truth about Ai and is slain by an enraged Raiga after being attacked with extreme prejudice. Matō is portrayed by Dai Watanabe (渡辺 大, Watanabe Dai).
- Jienda (ジエンダ): The last of the Ady Slate Horrors, Jienda is a Horror with an eye for a right hand. Having just possessed the body of a young woman, Jienda become the final host of Eyrith's seed. However, she is soon found by Eiji Busujima and easily knocked out so he can extract the seed from the Ady Slate Horror when she congregates back into a stone. The possessed woman is portrayed by Hiromi Eguchi.

=== Eyrith ===
Eyrith (エイリス, Eirisu) is an ancient plant-like Horror labeled as Messiah's Tear (メシアの涙, Meshia no Namida), and the originator of the Makai Trees. Eyrith is also tied to a legend that her flower, the Makai Flower (魔戒ノ花, Makai no Hana), has the power to resurrect the dead. Ages ago, Eyrith was sealed in the Ady Slate (アディーの石板, Adī no Sekiban) by Makai Priests using nine other Horrors as foundation stones. Having left the slate where it was after the sealing is completed rather than secure it, the slate was forgotten throughout the ages even by the Makai Order until it was eventually dug up in present-day by archaeologists. The slate ended up in a museum as an archaeological relic until a mysterious person, who is later revealed to be Eiji Busujima, unraveled the seal after opening hours.

Despite the slate's unsealing, Eyrith remains as a seed and is hidden within Idora, one of the Ady Slate Horrors who were also freed and each possessing the first human with inner darkness they come across. However, as Mayuri explained in the worst-case scenario, Eyrith would bloom within 100 days and enable Messiah's return by removing the boundaries that separate the human world from the Demon World. Though Raiga nearly succeeds in capturing it by slaying Idora once he finds her, Eyrith escapes by transferring its essence into the Ady Slate Horror Gogeet. As such, it is deemed impossible to capture and seal Eyrith until the remaining Ady Slate Horrors have been slain and sealed first. Despite Raiga finding and slaying Gogeet, Eyrith transfers into the last Ady Slate Horror left, Jienda, which is soon captured and Eyrith's seed is extracted by Eiji Busujima.

Accepting Busujima's wish to bring back his lover, Eyrith produces a cloned body of Akari that will come to life the moment Horror is fully grown and blooms. When the time of her blooming draws near, Eyrith intends to turn Mayuri into her host to reach the place where she can bloom. However, Crow offers himself to her in order to spare Mayuri. Seeing that the now-repentant Busijima no longer has his original wish, Eyrith cancels her pact with him and brutally beats him up when he tries to stop her. Once reaching her destination, Eyrith leaves Crow's body and assumes her true human-like form before proceeding to grow into a giant tree. From there, recruiting Zaji to wipe out the line of Garo by targeting Rekka and Rian, Eyrith proceeds to spirit numerous Horrors from across time and space so that the bulb on top of her body can bloom and she can unleash a Horror army on the world. When Raiga attempts to destroy the bulb, Eyrith manifests a nude demonic version of her human form to fight him. Ultimately, the fight ends with Eyrith revealed to be the one who took Raiga's parents from him before she uses her temporal powers to suck out the Makai Knight's remaining time in the Garo armor so he can drive off his friends in his Lost Soul Beast form while she can bloom without interference. However, Raiga is later awakened as the Light Awakening Beast Garo and promptly resume to foil her plans. In a desperate bid to further demoralize Raiga, she tells him that all she has summoned are Horrors in both the past and the future and how his attempts have ended in vain, to which Raiga asserts that they will be taken care of by the Makai Knights of the past and future, as he proceeds to destroy the rest of her tree body. Left defenseless, Mayuri releases all nine stones at once and seals what remains of Eyrith in the Ady Slate once more.

Eyrith is portrayed by Momoko Kuroki (黒木 桃子, Kuroki Momoko).

== Gold Storm Sho ==
These are the Horrors that appear in the film and television series Garo: Gold Storm Sho. The majority of Horrors in the television series are recruited servants of Jinga.

- Murado (ムラド): A bone-based Horror who possessed the body of a slum boss at the Wild Cat Bar, employing Horror familiars. When he learned that Rian is hunting him, Murado uses hoodlums Okabe and Fukaya to steal her Makai Gun so he and his familiars can kill her without trouble. But Ryuga's arrival ruins that and Murado finds himself slain by Ryuga after revealing himself in the restored Garo armor. Portrayed by Kazuya Shimizu (清水 一哉, Shimizu Kazuya).
- Okabe (オカベ): A hoodlum employed by Murado alongside Fukaya to steal Rian's Makai Gun, awarded with money. But one bill is revealed to be a Inga gate as Okabe later ends up being possessed by a Horror before being slain by Agō. Portrayed by Hiroyuki Yasoshima (八十島 弘行, Yasoshima Hiroyuki).
- Hell Zwei (ヘルツバイ, Heru Tsubai): A Horror that possesses the body of a girl, splitting into two to pose as twin sisters that can merge back into their true form. Hell Zwei is the third Horror that Ryuga has been encountering since a mysterious increase of Horror manifestations, Rian capturing one of the twins before the other appears with Ryuga arriving to pursue them. After attempting to hinder their pursuer by throwing humans at him, the twins assume their true form and attempt to kill a girl caught in the crossfire until Rian arrives to cancel their fusion. The twins attempt to convince Ryuga to let them have a final meal, but he refuses as he equips the Garo armor and cuts the reformed Hell Zwei down the middle. The possessed girl and her clone are portrayed by MIO and YAE, while both are voiced by Akiko Tanaka (田中 晶子, Tanaka Akiko).
- Bicro (ビクロ, Bikuro): A moth-winged Horror in the service of Jinga that manifests from the body of a man that Amily flung off a building. Allowed to act on his own devices, Bicro was about to eat a lady when Ryuga intercepts the Horror and forces him to flee. Bicro later gets instructions from Amily to find the red dagger that was part of the Hōken, facing Ryuga again before being slain by the Makai Knight with Rian's assistance. The possessed man is portrayed by Hidekazu Ichinose (市瀬 秀和, Ichinose Hidekazu).
- Bukeri (ブケリ): A blade-based Horror that feeds on live prey by stabbing into them, releasing a pressure through the victim's body that causes it explode before the blade sucks up the blood. By chance, Bukeri possesses the body of a robber named Hayashi (ハヤシ), eating his host's partner. Then, with indirect assistance from Amily, Bukeri fatally injures Mina with Rian watching the young woman die while Ryuga eventually slays Bukeri. Hayashi is portrayed by Kazuki Namioka (波岡 一喜, Namioka Kazuki).
- Scriptlla (スクリプトラ, Sukuriputora): A Horror that emerged from a type writer in the room where Risa and her accomplice Sakuma (サクマ) were placed after being captured by Jinga and Amily to be made into Horror hosts. Though Risa was saved by Ryuga and Rian, Sakuma ended up being possessed by Scriptlla before being slain by Ryuga. Sakuma is portrayed by Takahiro Kuroishi (黒石 高大, Kuroishi Takahiro).
- Vestage (ヴェスタージ, Vesutāji): A Ganesha-like Horror that possesses the body of Danke (ダンケ), the owner of an antique shop who has been distributing Inga gates across the city and has become a Horror after killing the one who murdered his beloved. But Danke is not bothered by transition, seeing no distinction between remorseless murderers and Horrors. When found by Rian, Danke captures her and attempts to make her a Horror's host. But she escapes before being joined by Ryuga as he destroys the Inga gates with Danke assuming his Horror form in response. But in the end, Vestage is killed and devoured by Jinga. Danke is portrayed by Lou Oshiba (ルー大柴, Rū Ōshiba).
- Ressade (レッサード, Ressādo): A mandible-mouth Horror that possesses the body of Sumida (スミダ), spending his day looking for a perfect dinner by targeting food vendors and preceding to feed on them after sunset. Ressade is eventually found by Ryuga and is slain after the Makai Knight equips the Garo armor with Gald supporting him. Sumida is portrayed by Michael Tomioka (マイケル富岡, Maikeru Tomioka).
- Woska (ウォスカ, Wosuka): A Horror that possesses the body of a heavily built man with knowledge of martial arts. Woska can be considered the most hated Horror before he targets children trained by Makai Knights as his food, his presence detected by Ryume after he devoured the students of Seiji Hiba, who cut off the Horror's ear to track him down to Daigo's school. Though Seiji manages to get his revenge with the help of Ryuga and Daigo, the fighting having worn the two Makai Knights out, Woska's displaced essence is absorbed by Jinga and Amily. The possessed man is portrayed by Masakatsu Funaki (船木 誠勝, Funaki Masakatsu).
- Zeraza (ゼラーザ, Zerāza): A festive Horror with power over electricity, using it to travel currents or enter electronic devices. Having possessed the body of a woman in a flamenco dress, Zeraza helps Jinga deal with Ryuga in return for entry into Radan, or the fallen Makai Knight's love if impossible. However, Zeraza is slain when Ryuga uses his tactics to ground the Horror's lightning attacks and delivered a slash that bifurcates her from the waist down. The possessed woman is portrayed by Mie (未唯, Mii).
- Hedera (ヘデラ): An Ent-like Horror that possesses the body of a business man, able to use vines in his attacks. Hedera is sent by Jinga and Amily to find the Houken in Yousei Forest with a hundred humans as payment. When Ryuga intervenes, Hedera assumes his true form before the Makai Knight destroys him after equipping the Garo armor. The possessed man is portrayed by Kyosuke Yabe (やべ きょうすけ, Yabe Kyōsuke).
- Geril (ゲリル, Geriru): A rotting-fish-like Horror that possesses the body of a drown man, able to turn into water. Geril is placed in the same cell as Garudo by Jinga in the fallen Makai Knight's attempt to get the whereabouts of the Houken from him. Though given permission to eat Garudo when the Makai Priest saw through him, Geril is ordered by Jinga to stop with the promise to eat Rian. Though Geril assumes his true form at Jinga's command, he is frozen in place by Rian as Ryuga slays him in the Garo armor. The possessed man is portrayed by Ken Maeda (前田 健, Maeda Ken).
- Begul (ベグル, Beguru): A giant humanoid crustacean Horror that dwells under the waters of a swamp, the tip of its tongue assuming the form of a naked woman that functions as an esca that preys on fishermen. Begul continued to feed until the large amount of dark energy it gave off attracted the attention of Ryuga, Rian, and Gald on the notion that it is Radan. After Gald confirms the Horror is not Radan, Rian lures the monster out of the swamp so she and Ryuga can hold it off while Gald seals the swamp to keep the Horror from retreating back to the water. Though the Horror nearly overwhelmed them, Ryuga noticed a crack he made in the Horror's carapace and has Rian delay his Garo armor so he can be in a position for the armor to do the most damage. Ryuga then proceeds to destroy the Horror from the inside out. The naked woman is portrayed by Mero Imai (今井 メロ, Imai Mero).
- Gueldina (ゲルダイナ, Gerudaina): A Horror resembling the Horror Palkeira, used by Jinga as a guard dog before it was destroyed by Ryume.

=== Degol ===
Known as the mad Horror, Degol (デゴル, Degoru) is an ancient red-skinned Horror that rampaged the area Line City was built on ages ago alongside his horde of Inga Horrors. He killed the Makai Priest Sōtatsu before being slain by the latter's creation Agō, with only his arm remaining as it was eventually sealed in a small shrine located in Line City since it could not be destroyed while the remainder of his horde were wiped out by a previous Garo. However, unaware that a fragment of Degol was in his body, Agō obtained the Horror's hand in an attempt to use Ryume to transmit the Horror's energy across Line City to kill everyone. But Degol eventually awakens and consumes Agō, creating a new centaur-like body before being slain for good by Ryuga with help from Agō.

Degol is voiced by Rintarō Nishi.

=== Radan ===
Radan (ラダン) is an ancient Horror, labeled as the Legendary Demon Castle (伝説の魔城, Densetsu no Majō), and is said to be a fortress too powerful to be destroyed. Once fully activated by two Horrors, with one becoming its ruler while the other becoming a moon that serves as its power source, Radan can absorb the life from the surrounding environment with its staff, open portals to the Demon World, fire an unlimited supply of projectiles, and command Horrors to form a scythe-like blade on its staff. The interior of Radan also serves as a defense system. Upon the death of Radan's previous king, two Makai Priests from Homura Village used the elements of yin and yang to create two daggers that form the Hōken blade that they used to seal Radan in the space between the human world and the Demon World.

In modern times, Jinga and Amily trick the Makai Priest Gen into helping them break the seal on Radan, with Jinga obtaining one of the Hōken's dagger components, while the other is retrieved by Ryuga and Rian. Jinga releases Radan with the intent to sit at its throne, going so far as to becoming cannibal to fulfill its requirement of needing its king to have consumed Horrors. Despite attempts by Ryuga and his allies to seal Radan while they still can, it is awakened during the next full moon after its release and it flies off to await its chosen denizen. Once Jinga is fully restored, he takes the throne of Radan while Amily becomes the castle's power source, while Jinga directs it to wipe out the city. Though Jinga makes Rian the new power source after Amily is too wounded to continue, she sacrifices herself to enable Ryuga to use the stolen life force to force Radan back its inactive state and then Gald reseals the castle. The Hōken is then sent to the space between the human world and the Demon World where it shatters to ensure that the seal can never be broken again.

== Jinga ==
Jinga (神牙（ジンガ）) (Note: The kanji that make up the name "Jinga" (神牙, Jinga) are literally translated as "God Fang".) is the main antagonist of the television series Garo: Gold Storm Sho, a cynical and arrogant manipulator who was once a Makai Knight. As revealed in Garo: Makai Retsuden, well known among the Makai Order with the nickname "Fang of God" (神の牙, Kami no Kiba) derived from his own name, Jinga first met Amily during a mission to retrieve a Spirit Beast pelt delivered by her group of Makai Priestesses. Despite unsavory first impressions, Jinga developed feelings for Amily as the two married and traveled the country to hunt Horrors while training their son Yuto (ユウト, Yūto) to become a Makai Knight. But after slaying a Horror that plagued a village that considered it a rural demon they were appeasing with human sacrifices, Jinga and Amily return to find their son was ritualistically murdered by the villagers who assumed they would not return. This causes Jinga and his wife to lose their sanity and go on a rage-filled killing spree that extended to neighboring villages before Makai Priest Moyuru sacrificed himself to allow Gald and Haruna, survivors of one of the slaughtered villages, to escape to his home village Homura. Though they intended to die for their actions, Jinga and Amily survived Moyuru's suicidal attack and end up at an Inga gate in the form of a gravestone ring in the forest at night, resulting with their Inga transforming them into their current Horror incarnations. Jinga, having been similar to Ryuga when human, saw his transition into a Horror as a liberating aphrodisiac. While once considering revenge a motive in his actions, Jinga resolves to release Radan and use its power to conquer the world.

Jinga begins his scheme of freeing Radan by tricking a Makai Priest into breaking the seal on the Horror Radan for his own agenda, acquiring one of the twin daggers that form the Hōken and seeks the other while waiting for Radan to reawaken. He also employs Horrors by creating Inga gates and offering the emerging Horrors human hosts. When the daggers resonate with each other, he and Amily casually go to meet Raiga and Rian and promptly reveal themselves to be Horrors while attempting to take their dagger. The fight ultimately ends in a stalemate as Gald grabs both blades and merges them back into the Hōken. Regardless, Jinga later abducts Gald in an attempt to find where he has hidden the Hōken, but he still has a fixation on Ryuga and orchestrates a side scheme to have the young Makai Knight give in to his darkness. After transferring his spiritual essence into Rian when his physical form is destroyed by Ryuga, Jinga attempts to consume her being to create a new body for himself while taunting Ryuga with Rian's memories. But Rian manages to make Jinga prisoner in her own mind while the others attempt to purge him from her with the waters of a holy spring. Amily stops the summoning ritual and kisses Rian to absorb Jinga's spiritual essence, offering herself for him to restore his physical form. Jinga later reconstitutes Amily's body and the two enter Radan before assuming his place as its king, while directing the giant to make its way to the city to take everyone's life energy. The plan fails and Jinga is slain by Ryuga.

In Garo: Kami no Kiba, the Horror Rinza tricks Banbi into resurrecting Jinga, as a fallen Makai Knight is needed to activate the Fang of God. The process rendering him amnesiac, Jinga fights Ryuga and his friends before fleeing with a dying Banbi whom he turns into a replica of Amily. Seeing through Rinza despite his memory loss, Jinga joins Rinza's army to use the Fang of God in order to conquer the world while using Boel to create the Fang of God and sending Banbi to fight Rian. Jinga then joins the fray while returning their knights' Makai armor to defeat them as the Fang of God activates, his memories fully restored as he kills Rinza while revealing his only motivation is settling the score with Ryuga. The two battle before Jinga is once more slain by Ryuga, reunited with Amily in the Demon World as he decides to battle an awakened Messiah.

As revealed in Kami no Kiba: Jinga, after being destroyed by Messiah, Jinga eventually reincarnated as a human and a Makai Knight named Jinga Mikage, an impossible case as Horrors do not truly die. Furthermore, due to Jinga's abilities as a cannibal Horror, Mikage possesses the ability to suppress Horrors within human hosts with the illusion of the humans being purified. Jinga eventually begins manifesting after Mikage followed a butterfly familiar conjured by Amily during one of his missions and once possessed the human to kill Shijo. Jinga finally 'introduces' himself to his reincarnated self one night, chastising Mikage for keeping to his mission as a Makai Knight and his decision of avoiding the darks aspects of their power. The resulting battle from the 'introduction' ends inconclusively, Jinga deciding to observe his reincarnated self and unconsciously manipulated the youth in breaking ties in everyone he knew and loved. Jinga then kills Mikage to complete his resurrection, devouring Toma after the two battle before departing.

Unlike most Makai Knight-turned Horrors, Jinga's original Horror form had since sculpted into a being clad in grotesque-looking Demon Beast Exoskeleton seemingly themed after Roze Armor, Makai Armor donned by his reincarnated self Mikage, which he summons forth by swiping his left fist sideways. In his armored state, Jinga can sprout webbed wings for flight and has a tail with a sharp spine on the end to grab others. As he took to eating other Horrors to prepare himself to take Radan's throne, one of the abilities Jinga acquired from it is the ability to suppress a Horror within its human host and summon it to manifest at will.

Jinga is portrayed by Masahiro Inoue (井上 正大, Inoue Masahiro).

== Amily ==
Amily (アミリ, Amiri) is Jinga's assistant, a cannibal Horror who was originally a Makai Priestess and Jinga's wife. As revealed in Garo: Makai Retsuden, being timid and inexperienced, Amily was from the Seiran Valley where many Makai tools are developed. She met Jinga while delivering a Spirit Beast pelt alongside her fellow Makai Priestesses, having a bad first impression of before getting to know him better and developed feelings for him. Amily later married Jinga after completing her training and traveled with him alongside their son. But when their son was sacrificed by villagers who were terrorized by a Horror that she and Jinga killed for their sake, a grieving Amily aided her husband in slaughtering the villagers. The two were stopped by the Makai Priest Moyuru who sacrificed himself to save Gald and Haruna, some of the few survivors. After surviving Moyuru's suicidal attempt to kill her and Jinga, the two later happened to wonder into an Inga gate in the form of a gravestone ring in the forest at night, and the Inga within them transformed them into their current Horror incarnations.

Being a former Makai Priestess and armed with a Madō brush, arrogant and seductive in her current state, Amily has extensive knowledge of magical spells and uses blue butterfly constructs as her spies, eating them to acquire their knowledge, while also recruiting Horrors to serve Jinga's purposes. Amily also possesses the Demon Mirror, a relic that allows its user to increase another's power. Amily helps Jinga in his plan to revive Radan, even revealing to Ryuga and Rian that she and her husband are Horrors when the pair are sent to reseal Radan. While captured by Ryuga's group, Amily feigns regaining her remorseful humanity to trick Ryuga into entering the Demon Mirror and then escaping Gald and Daigo's custody to meet back up with Jinga.

When Jinga transfers his spiritual essence into Rian, Amily sends her blue butterfly constructs to find him. She eventually discovers his location and Amily interferes in Ryuga, Daigo, and Ryume's ceremony of banishing Jinga from Rian's body. Amily takes Rian and kisses her, absorbing Jinga's spiritual essence into her own body so he can restore himself before reconstituting her body later. Once Radan is activated, Amily, in a blue dress composed of her butterfly familiars, offers herself to become the castle's moon-like power source. But after Rian mortally wounds her, Amily ends up being killed by Jinga who has turned Rian into the new power source.

In Garo: Kami no Kiba, an amnesiac Jinga transforms the deceased Banbi into a puppet replica of Amily which Rian managed to kill. After Jinga is slain and returned to the Demon World, Amily meets him and is witness to him attempting to defeat the awakened Messiah that ended with his demise. Following Jinga's reincarnation into Jinga Mikage, Amily infiltrated the Mikage family as Madō Ring Alva (魔導輪アルヴァ, Madōrin Aruva) and help influence events for her beloved to resurrect himself during the events of Kami no Kiba: Jinga. Amily eventually reveals herself and holds Rozan off long enough for Jinga to be fully restored.

Amily is portrayed by Miyavi Matsunoi (松野井 雅, Matsunoi Miyabi), also voicing Alva.

== Makai Retsuden ==
- Gagal (ガガル, Gagaru): A Horror residing the Bon Jackpot before he is killed by Wataru, portrayed by Ippei Saitō (斉藤 一平, Saitō Ippei).
- Gegem (ゲゲム, Gegemu): A Horror residing the Bon Jackpot before he is killed by Wataru, portrayed by Kouji Tsujimoto (辻本 耕志, Tsujimoto Kōji).
- Babaro (ババロ): A Horror residing the Bon Jackpot before he is killed by Wataru, portrayed by Namihei Koshige (こしげ なみへい, Koshige Namihei).
- Bartender: A Horror residing the Bon Jackpot before he is killed by Wataru after serving him a drink on request, portrayed by Sennin Takemori (竹森 千人, Takemori Sennin).
- Jan (ジャン): A Horror from the neighboring First Fort that was attacked by Wataru, telling a story of how the strongest Horrors of his group were easily killed off. Jan is portrayed by Oolongta Yoshida (吉田 ウーロン太, Yoshida Ūronta), with Quickdraw Kane (早撃ちのケーン, Hayauchi no Kēn) portrayed by Mizuho Yoshida, Hustler Bean (ハスラーのビーン, Hasurā no Bīn) portrayed by Takahiro Tsuboya (坪谷 隆寛, Tsuboya Takahiro), Dancer Jean (ダンスのジーン, Dansu no Jīn) portrayed by Ayako Hino (日野 綾子, Hino Ayako), and First Fort's Bartender (第一砦のバーテン, Daiichi Toride no Bāten) portrayed by Yūki Nakamura (中村 裕樹, Nakamura Yūki).
- Hoodlum: A thug during Ryuga's time as Garo who harassed Rian before she drove him and his gang off when they beating up a young man attempting to protect her. The hoodlum ended up becoming a Horror's host and killed by Rian soon after. Portrayed by Kazunari Matsufuji (松藤 和成, Matsufuji Kazunari).
- Miele (ミエーレ, Miēre): A wasp-like Horror from Ryuga's time as Garo who fought him on a sky.
- Camphanto (カムファント, Kamufanto): A Horror from Ryuga's time as Garo who possessed the body of a woman, able to assume the form whoever she had devoured. After taking the form of an electric worker to infiltrate Haruna's high school, Camphanto devours Ibuki, the president of astronomy club, and attempts to devour the club members. However, Camphanto's attempt is prevented by Daigo before the Makai Knight equips the Giga armor and slays the Horror. The possessed woman is portrayed by LUY, while the electrical worker and Ibuki are portrayed by Motokuni Nakagawa (中川 素州, Nakagawa Motokuni) and Kohki Osamura (長村 航希, Osamura Kōki) respectively.
- Antaeus (アンタイオス, Antaiosu): A bat-like Horror from Raiga's time as Garo who possesses the body of a young nymphomanic Yukino (ユキノ), targeting men she has a crush. Antaeus targets a dancer named Hikaru before Daichi managed to enable the human's escape at cost to his wellbeing before Raiga arrived and slays the Horror. Yukino is portrayed by Kaede Aono (青野 楓, Aono Kaede).
- Binos (バイノス, Bainosu): A rhinoceros-like large Horror who possessed the body of Kazuma (カズマ), a retired Makai Knight-to-be who was Tsubasa's friend, moving into the city where is ends up becoming a Horror. Forced to fight Tsubasa and Jabi, Kazuma assumes his true form before Tsubasa slays him. Kazuma is portrayed by Yoshio Kojima (小島 よしお, Kojima Yoshio).

== Zarugin ==
Zarugin (ザルギン) is a powerful minotaur-like Horror from Gouki's time, the antagonist of Garo: Ashura. Based from his fortress in the Northern Valley, Zarugin and his familiars ravage the countryside before Gouki confronts them yet is overpowered by Zarugin. It was only with the aid of his new friends that Gouki gained the power to slay Zarugin.

Zarugin is portrayed by Togi Makabe (真壁 刀義, Makabe Tōgi).

== Zero: Dragon Blood ==
- Rabiria (ラビリア): A rabbit-based Horror, drawing guests to be devoured by the Horrors dwelling in one of the hotel suites after possessing the body of Kugano (クガノ), a hotel front desk clerk. He later draws Alice to be eaten by the Horrors as well, but she is rescued by Rei, who disposes of all the Horrors in the hotel to rescue her before slaying him. Kugano is portrayed by Moro Morooka (モロ師岡).
- Zagira (ザギーラ, Zagīra): A plant-based Horror that emerged from a table lamp to possess the body of Lily (リリイ, Ririi), a dancer. Lily is portrayed by Nori Sato (佐藤 乃莉, Satō Nori).
- Kurugeru (クルーゲル, Kurūgeru): A gun-based Horror that emerged from a bullet to possess the body of Jun (ジュン), a gang member. Jun is portrayed by Atsushi Arai (荒井 敦史, Arai Atsushi), while a young Jun is portrayed by Fūka Matsunaga (松永 風夏, Matsunaga Fūka).
- Raira (ライラ): A gigantic dog/bear-faced centipede-based Horror that possessed the body of an unnamed young woman. Living at a wishing bell, she grants people visions of their greatest desires before devouring them. In human form, she can stretch her body out like a snake, wrapping up her victims. The possessed woman is portrayed by Misaki Momose (桃瀬 美咲, Momose Misaki).
- Masukarada (マスカラーダ, Masukarāda): A termite-based Horror that possessed the body of Towako (トワコ). She gets her victims (young men) by firstly seducing them, then manifesting termites from her body to eat them alive. Towako is portrayed by Akari Hoshino (星野 あかり, Hoshino Akari).

== Kami no Kiba ==
=== Rinza ===
Rinza (リンザ) is a centauress-like Horror who gathers information on the Fang of God from a freelance professor researching the Makai community and its lore to summon Messiah into the world. She can controls a horde of Horror zombies as minions, disguise herself as other humans, and fire explosive spark bolts produced s by scraping the heels of her high-heels on rough surfaces. She deceives Banbi into aiding her by promising to revive her love Judo Tenma, claiming to help her steal Makai Knight armors in order to feed on the powerless Makai Knights later. When Banbi initiates her resurrection ritual, Rinza swaps out a strain of Judo's hair for that of Jinga's, after deeming Judo too weak to be used as a sacrificial offering to activate the Fang of God. While claiming to have summoned him to usher a new age of Horrors and swearing her loyalty, Jinga sees through Rinza's ruse and unceremoniously slays her later when she turns on him.

Rinza is portrayed by Sayaka Sasaki (佐咲 紗花, Sasaki Sayaka), a singer who did several songs for the Garo animation franchise.

=== Boel ===
Boel (ボエル, Boeru) is a dimwitted Horror accompanying Rinza, serving as her second in command. His true Horror form is that of a large bullish creature, and is resistant to physical attacks both in his human form and his Horror form. He is slain by Jinga in order to build the Fang of God and initiate the ritual.

Boel is portrayed by Cookie (くっきー, Kukkī).

=== Hederick ===
Hederick (ヘデリック, Hederikku) is a Horror under Rinza that possesses the body of a hoodlum. Hederick is slain by Aguri.

The hoodlum is portrayed by Yusuke Yamaguchi (山口 侑佑, Yamaguchi Yūsuke).

=== Jagi ===
Jagi (ジャギ) is a bat-like Horror under Rinza that possesses the body of a gang leader. Jagi is slain by Takeru.

The gang leader is portrayed by Ichizou (一三, Ichizō).

== Kami no Kiba: Jinga ==
- Nonrosso (ノンロッソ): A Horror targeting humans who are powerless yet with a strong will to protect their children, willing to go extreme lengths, such as murder, to keep their children safe. It emerged from a family photo to possess the body of Rena (玲奈), a truck driver, who was about to be killed by her husband and his mistress, to commit insurance fraud. Nonrosso acts only on Rena's maternal instincts, feeding on men she prostitutes herself to in order keep Rena's children from starving, and is otherwise seemingly benign. This created a conflict with Jinga due to comparing Nonrosso to his past trauma before recomposing himself and slaying her. Rena is portrayed by Masako Umemiya (梅宮 万紗子, Umemiya Masako).
- Cadena (カデーナ, Kadēna): A Horror that is seemingly indestructible against Soul Metal blades and is symbiotic by nature, possessing the body of Kanae (佳菜恵), a bullied high school girl, after emerging from the chains used to tie her up in her school's gym. Cadena gives Kanae the power to take revenge on her bullies before Jinga suppressed the Horror with Kanae's body. Before Jinga realized he was the cause of an unexpected feat and assuming that he exorcized the Horror, it was assumed that the peculiar phenomenon was attributed to Cadena. Kanae is portrayed by Riko Nagai (永井 理子, Nagai Riko).
- Fons (フォーンス, Fōnsu): A Horror taking the form of a large mirror in an abandoned building. Instead of possessing a host like most others, it instead acts as an Inga gate for other Horrors to emerge, by petrifying whoever stands in front of it and amplify the victim's Inga by bringing up their personal traumas and insecurities. Fons' body is destroyed by Jinga shortly after asserting his righteousness in his actions of cutting down his father, but not before turning Toma into a Horror's host.
- Ishida (石田): Initially a mild-mannered, kind-hearted pro wrestler before he unknowingly caused the death of his wife and son by helping a petty criminal, he ended up becoming a Horror after losing his faith in humanity and made a living in the underground fighting ring where he gain fame as a masked wrestler wearing a mask his son made for him. Ishida would use his Horror powers to hunt and feed on the scum of society, his sense of honor keeping him from attacking innocents. When Ishida tried to kill a young fighter named Fox, a fame seeker who tried to ruin his career before their upcoming match, Jinga manages to suppress his Horror. This restores Ishida to his original self as he spares Fox and takes him under his wing as an apprentice. Ishida is portrayed by Kazuyuki Fujita (藤田 和之, Fujita Kazuyuki).
- Melee (メイレー, Meirē): A Horror that possesses the body of Rika (梨花) after emerging from her mother's wristwatch. Rika is portrayed by Hazuki Shimizu (清水 葉月, Shimizu Hazuki).
- Rebiju (レビジュ): A Horror that possesses the body of Hitoshi (ヒトシ), a thief. Hitoshi is portrayed by Haruki Takano (高野 春樹, Takano Haruki).
- Roska (ロスカ, Rosuka): A Horror that possesses the body of Okajima (岡島). Okajima is portrayed by Ryujin Suzuki (鈴木 隆仁, Suzuki Ryūjin).

== Gekkou no Tabibito ==
- Ruto (ルト): A scorpion-like Horror that possesses the body of a woman and targets women. Ruto is slain by Raiga. The possessed woman is portrayed by Yuria Eda (江田 友莉亜, Eda Yuria).

== Hagane o Tsugu Mono ==
- Chaurus (シャウラス, Shaurasu): A Horror that inhabits a digital signage display and possesses the body of Miwako (美和子), a model. Chaurus is slain by Ryuga. Miwako is portrayed by Mai Nambu (南部 麻衣, Nanbu Mai).
- Regrege (レグレージ, Regurēji): A Horror that possesses the body of Tsutomu Murashige (村重 勉, Murashige Tsutomu), a constructor. Regrege is slain by Souma. Tsutomu Murashige is portrayed by Jouji Shibue (渋江 譲二, Shibue Jōji).
- Lucargol (ルカルゴル, Rukarugoru): A Horror that possesses the body of Takeo Taniguchi (谷口 武夫, Taniguchi Takeo), a victim of extortion. Lucargol is slain by Ryuga. Takeo Taniguchi is portrayed by Shinya Yamamura (山村 真也, Yamamura Shin'ya).
- Kazamatsuri (風祭): A fraud company president who became the host of a Horror emerging from a telephone. He is slain by Ryuga. Portrayed by Toshiki Kashu (賀集 利樹, Kashū Toshiki).
- Gaera (ガエラ): A Horror that possesses the body of Naomi (ナオミ), a nightclub waitress. Gaera is slain by Ryuga. Naomi is portrayed by Miki Nishino (西野 未姫, Nishino Miki).
- Zygarus (ジガルス, Jigarusu): A Horror slain by Godou.

== Taiga ==
- Candolier (キャンドリア, Kyandoria): A Flame Beast Horror (炎獣ホラー, Enjū Horā) that possesses the body of an angler. Candolier is slain by Taiga. The angler is portrayed by Katsuhiro Higo (肥後 克広, Higo Katsuhiro).
- Gido (ギド) and Abi (アビ): Horrors that serve as Jadou's minions and assume the form of twin brothers. Portrayed by Yuhi Otsu (大津 夕陽, Ōtsu Yūhi) and Asahi Otsu (大津 朝陽, Ōtsu Asahi).

=== Jadou ===
Jadou (蛇道, Jadō) is a Snake Venom Horror (蛇毒ホラー, Jadoku Horā) who was originally an elderly female Makai Guide serving the small shrine of the Sacred Beasts. He can absorb the memories and abilities of the humans he ate and transform his Horror form into the dragon-like Jadouryu (蛇道龍, Jadōryū). He seeks to eat the Sacred Beast Kirin and the other four Sacred Beasts to gain their powers.

Jadou is portrayed by Toshiki Seto (瀬戸 利樹, Seto Toshiki).

== Higashi no Kairou ==
- Zagdam (ザグダム, Zagudamu): A Waste Horror (廃棄物ホラー, Haikibutsu Horā). Zagdam is slain by Ryuga.
- Scorgan (スコルガン, Sukorugan): A Sand Spear Horror (砂槍ホラー, Sunayari Horā). Scorgan is slain by Ryuga.

=== Garzas ===
Garzas (ガルザス, Garuzasu) is a Horror known as the King of Sand (砂の王, Suna no Ō). He can turn areas into deserts and create and manipulate Horrors and an army of Sand Warriors (サンドウォーリアーズ, Sando Wōriāzu). He is slain by Ryuga.

Garzas is voiced by Kenji Nomura (乃村 健次, Nomura Kenji).

=== Aquas ===
Aquas (アクアス, Akuasu) is a Horror that does not possess humans but manipulates them with tainted water. She is slain by Ryuga.

Aquas is voiced by Maaya Sakamoto (坂本 真綾, Sakamoto Maaya).
