= I Am the Media =

- Directed by: Benjamin Rassat
- Distributed by: Arte
- Release date: April 21, 2010
- Running time: 58 minutes
- Country: France
- Language: French

I Am the Media is a 2010 French documentary film by Benjamin Rassat.

== Background ==
Shot in 15 countries, Benjamin Rassat interviewed people such as Vinton Cerf, Steve Jobs, Justin Kan, Robert Scoble, Andrew Keen, Loic Le Meur and Magibon, discussing the history of digital narcissism and social networks. Interviewees were asked: "Did you google me?" and "Do you google yourself?".

Censored for two years in France, the movie first aired on 21 April 2010, on Arte; a directors' cut can be seen on Iamthemedia.tv. The film was released in Germany as Von Bloggern und Internet-Freaks.

== Reception ==
Les Inrockuptibles in its review of the film, wrote: "Critical, without being manichean, Benjamin Rassat uses self-centered and self-deprecating humor to analyze the explosion of ego on the net)," and "Benjamin Rassat illustrates his point by his own narcissism. He stages outrageous self-interviews, presenting different sequences with especially distilled false information, deliberately and discreetly."

In its analysis and review, nonfiction.fr wrote: "Benjamin Rassat poses an ironic contemporary society, focusing on three fundamental aspects: the power of media, the "narcissistic temptation" renewed by the computer age, and the staging of multiple identities seeking to assert their existence in the insubstantial fabric of the net in a time of disillusionment and loneliness".

I Am the Media received mixed reactions when previewed by an audience of professionals; some thought Rassat was ridiculing them.

On the website Iamthemedia.tv and on the personal mail of the director, Vinton Cerf, one of the fathers of the Internet, let this message : "Just watched it - powerful! thought-provoking. I didn't go back to check - who is the guy on the boat - he's extraordinarily articulate and insightful"
