= Kiba Gaiden =

Japanese name
- Kanji: 呀〈KIBA〉 ～暗黒騎士鎧伝～
Transcriptions
- Revised Hepburn: KIBA: Ankoku Kishi Gaiden
- Directed by: Keita Amemiya
- Written by: Keita Amemiya
- Starring: Masaki Kyomoto; Mika Hijii; Leah Dizon
- Distributed by: Tohokushinsha Film
- Release date: September 7, 2011
- Running time: 45 minutes
- Country: Japan
- Language: Japanese

Kiba Gaiden (呀〈KIBA〉 ～暗黒騎士鎧伝～, KIBA: Ankoku Kishi Gaiden; lit. 'Kiba: Dark Knight Side Story') is a spin-off V-Cinema of the GARO television series, released on Blu-ray and DVD on September 7, 2011. A limited theatrical release took place on September 3, 2011, in Tokyo's Ikebukuro district and on September 4, 2011, in Osaka's Umeda district at Cine Libre theaters.

Actor and musician Masaki Kyomoto reprises his role as psychologist and counselor Karune Ryuzaki, the disguise for villainous Makai Knight Barago who is later taken over by the Dark Makai Knight Kiba, from the original Garo television series in a film revealing the character's history as well as the character's actions during the television series prior to his final battle. Mika Hijii also reprises her role as Kaoru Mitsuki, the female lead of Garo and one of Ryuzaki's patients who Barago intends to use to revive the Horror Messiah. Singer Leah Dizon joins the cast of Kiba Gaiden as the mysterious woman known as Makai Guide Elda who directs Barago towards his goal.

== Plot ==
Set around the final chapters of the "Black Fang" arc of Garo, the 23rd episode in the first series, the movie is divided into three acts: Memory, Knight, and Makai.

Awakening after being kidnapped from Saejima Manor, Kaoru finds herself in a room with Barago and a Makai Guide, Elda, as she learns her part in the former's plan to summon the Horrors' source, Messiah. Demanding how Barago could be a pawn of evil, he explained that he freely chose darkness to become stronger. To clarify all mysteries, he actually takes the time to tell her about his origins.

Barago was born from a Makai family, his mother was a Makai Priestess and his father was a Makai Knight. Their family was once a happy one until Barago's mother fell ill. Her frailty gave him the drive to become a stronger person, to protect her as he trained to become a Makai Knight. Unfortunately, things take a turn for the worse when his mother is possessed by a Horror and Barago is forced to watch his father kill her before his eyes.

His mother's death drives Barago to hate Horrors and also convinces him leave home to become a stronger warrior. His father later dies fighting Horrors, but he admits that he felt no sadness for his father's death. He ironically hates Makai Knights more than Horrors. However, for the sake of power, he eventually found apprenticeship under Taiga Saejima. Barago still desires greater power and Taiga saw him unfit to bear the title of Garo. To that end, Barago finds the Madou Book of the Dark Arts and forms a contract with Messiah to absorb her. Christened as "Kiba the Dark Knight", Barago eventually breaks the limits of his armor and proceeds to devour many Horrors to reach his quota of one thousand in preparation of absorbing Messiah.

Soon after the story ends, a shocked Kaoru learns from Barago that he has also devoured Makai Knights and has intentions to consume Kouga in front of her. Kaoru becomes hysterical and is knocked out by Elda. Barago begins to remember one Makai Knight from his past: Bado the Storm Knight. The two fought many battles before, but in one final confrontation where Kiba won, he was covered in energy and was unaware of the effects of Bado's last attack.

Awake, again, Kaoru learns from Elda's past. She once loved a Makai Knight named Shinji, but they were star-crossed lovers. The two were ordered to find the remains of a Horror named Gyanon. While on the journey, for unexplained reasons, the two were struck down in an act of treachery by two accompanying Makai Knights (for reasons never specified). As Elda lay dying, aware that Gyanon's corpse has been mysteriously taken away by reading her tarot cards earlier, she witnesses Barago arriving for the missing Horror and killing the two Makai Knights instead. Soon after, she agrees to become his follower and is reborn with a Horror influence.

Afterwards, Elda is tempted to harm Kaoru, but Barago arrives to reveal that Messiah is to enter Kaoru's body. Astonished by the girl's lack of memory, Barago explains to Kaoru that in one of their past counselling sessions, Messiah briefly took possession of her body. It is in that time Messiah opened Barago's eyes that Bado left an energy of light within him. Sent into the deep recesses of his mind, Barago proceeds to destroy the trace of light that has assumed the form of the Garo the Golden Knight. Donning his armor, Barago battles and defeats Garo in armored combat. However, as the story ends, Messiah takes over Kaoru's body again and it is revealed that there is still a faint light within Barago: the love for his mother. Driven by his convictions for power, Barago manages to destroy the last shred of light within him (cutting down his beloved mother, his last light) and proceeds with his descent to the very depths of darkness.

== Cast ==
- Karune Ryuzaki (龍崎 駈音, Ryūzaki Karune): Masaki Kyomoto (京本 政樹, Kyōmoto Masaki)
- Kaoru Mitsuki (御月 カオル, Mitsuki Kaoru), Messiah (メシア, Meshia): Mika Hijii (肘井 美佳, Hijii Mika)
- Makai Guide Elda (魔戒導師エルダ, Makai Dōshi Eruda): Leah Dizon (リア・ディゾン, Ria Dizon)
- Barago's mother: Mikoto Inoue (井上 美琴, Inoue Mikoto)
- Young Barago: Raima Hiramatsu (平松 來馬, Hiramatsu Raima)
- Image of Barago: Mizuho Yoshida (吉田 瑞穂, Yoshida Mizuho)
- Image of Messiah: Asami (亜紗美)
- Bado (バド; Voice): Kazuhiko Inoue (井上 和彦, Inoue Kazuhiko)
- Knights (Voice): Shinya Iida (飯田 真矢, Iida Shinya), Kokoro Tanaka (たなか こころ, Tanaka Kokoro)

== Theme song ==
- "Warrior ~Yami o Kakeru Kiba~" (Warrior ～闇を駆けるキバ～; Warrior ~Run Through the Darkness Kiba~).
  - Lyrics & Composition: Hironobu Kageyama
  - Arrangement: Kenichi Sudō
  - Artist: Hironobu Kageyama
