= Ninja (film) =

- Official theatrical poster.
- Directed by: Isaac Florentine
- Written by: Boaz Davidson; Michael Hurst
- Produced by: Boaz Davidson; Avi Lerner; Danny Lerner; Les Weldon
- Starring: Scott Adkins; Tsuyoshi Ihara; Mika Hijii; Todd Jensen
- Cinematography: Ross W. Clarkson
- Edited by: Irit Raz
- Music by: Stephen Edwards
- Production company: Nu Image
- Distributed by: First Look; Lionsgate
- Release date: October 22, 2009
- Running time: 83 minutes
- Country: United States
- Languages: English; Japanese
- Budget: $10 million
- Box office: $194,243

Ninja is a 2009 American martial arts film directed by Isaac Florentine and starring Scott Adkins, Tsuyoshi Ihara and Mika Hijii. The film's plot revolves around an American martial artist named Casey Bowman, who is asked by his sensei to travel to New York City and protect the Yoroi Bitsu, an armored chest that contains the weapons of the last Kōga ninja.

Ninja: Shadow of a Tear, a sequel to the film, made its premiere at the 2013 Fantastic Fest in Austin, Texas.

== Plot ==
Casey Bowman is an American orphan, who is adopted into a martial arts dojo in Japan. Due to his perseverance and desire to master bushido, Casey earns the respect of his Sensei Takeda and his daughter Namiko. However, the dojo's top student Masazuka becomes bitter over Namiko's friendship with Casey. One morning, during a sparring match, Masazuka loses his temper and nearly kills Casey by throwing a katana at him. In self-defense, Casey scars Masazuka below his right eye. As a result of his actions, Masazuka is expelled from the dojo by Sensei Takeda.

Years later, Masazuka becomes an assassin of an organization called "Temple Industries", which itself runs an underground cult known as "The Ring". He returns to his former dojo and claims the succession as sōke, but Takeda turns him down. Anticipating an invasion by Masazuka, Takeda assigns Casey and Namiko to guard an old chest called the "Yoroi Bitsu", which contains the suit and weapons of an ancient Koga ninja. Before Masazuka storms the dojo and murders Takeda, Casey and Namiko manage to take the "Yoroi Bitsu" to New York City, where they keep it safe at Triborough University's vault with the help of Takeda's friend, Professor Garrison. They are tracked down by Masazuka, who sends Temple's thugs to take down the couple.

While Casey and Namiko are on the run, they are framed for the murder of Professor Garrison and arrested. During their interrogation, Casey is ridiculed by Detective Traxler. Disguising himself as Namiko's lawyer, Masazuka slips into the station and cuts the power. He takes down several cops in the dark before incapacitating Namiko. In the midst of the chaos, Casey saves Traxler from being gunned down by Masazuka, who leaves with Namiko. After receiving a tip-off through a member of Temple's thugs, Casey storms Temple Industries, retrieving Masazuka's phone number from the firm's president. He calls Masazuka and sets up a meeting place to exchange the "Yoroi Bitsu" for Namiko's life. Casey then rushes to the university to retrieve the chest and don the ninja suit and the arsenal.

At a construction site, Masazuka releases Namiko once the "Yoroi Bitsu" is lowered from a crane, only to discover the chest empty. The two men prepare for a final showdown, but members of The Ring stage an ambush under Temple's orders to kill the trio. Together, Casey, Namiko and Masazuka beat the thugs. Masazuka uses a blowgun to shoot a poison dart at Namiko and taunts Casey with the antidote bottle. However, Masazuka drops the bottle, forcing Casey into a fit of rage. As an NYPD helicopter flashes its spotlight on the fight, Masazuka uses a ninjutsu technique to blind Casey with the reflections from his katana and disappears in front of him. Casey uses his instincts to counter-attack and impales Masazuka from behind. Casey is saddened that he is unable to save Namiko. However, upon remembering his sensei's teachings of a ninja's katana possessing the power to both kill and heal, and discovers the antidote inside the handle of his katana. Within seconds, the antidote neutralizes the poison as Namiko awakens. Before they leave, Casey decapitates Masazuka.

The next morning, Traxler informs Casey and Namiko that Temple has been arrested and The Ring has been smashed. He gives them their passports and tells them to leave New York City for good. The couple return to Japan to pay homage to their late sensei and continue running their dojo.

== Cast ==
- Scott Adkins as Casey Bowman
- Tsuyoshi Ihara as Masazuka
- Mika Hijii as Namiko Takeda
- Todd Jensen as Detective Traxler
- Miles Anderson as Mr. Temple
- Garrick Hagon as Professor Paul Garrison
- Togo Igawa as Sensei Takeda
- Valentin Ganev as Yuri Klimitov
- Atanas Srebrev as Detective Vukovich
- Fumio Demura as Dai Shihan
- Masaki Onishi as Ryuu
- Nikolai Sotirov as Adamovich
- Kenji Motomiya as Akira
- Asen Asenov as Big Armed Man
- Ivailo Dimitrov as Bodyguard
- Krassimir Gospodinov as Clerk
- Michael Oren Johnson as Desk Sergeant
- Ivo Kehayov as Cop
- Judith Michelle Hill as Neighbor Woman
- Meglena Karalambova as Rachel
- Franklin A. Vallente as 2nd Uniformed Cop
- Velislav Pavlov as Security Guard
- Plamen Manasiev as Spokesperson
- Velizar Binev as Waiter
- Asen Blatechki as Failed Guard
- Raicho Vasilev as Gunman
- Vladimir Mihaylov as Custom Man

== Reception ==
Ninja has received mixed reviews. Felix Vasquez, Jr. of Cinema Crazed gave the film three out of four stars, calling it "Far better than Ninja Assassin, Nu Image's ninja follow-up is an entertaining ham and cheese sandwich that will really live up to its promises of ass kicking and blood splatter." On the other hand, Brian Orndorf of DVD Talk gave the film one-and-a-half out of five stars, saying it "just wants to flip and bleed, not invite the spectator into the mayhem, hoping a few throwing stars and quick blades will be enough to satisfy the faithful."

== Sequel ==
In November 2012, Nu Image and Millennium Films announced that Ninja 2 is in production, with Isaac Florentine returning to the director's chair. Scott Adkins and Mika Hijii have been confirmed to reprise their roles from the first film. Kane Kosugi confirmed on his website that he will play the new antagonist in the sequel. Fight choreographer Akihiro "Yuji" Noguchi is replaced by Chinese-Swedish martial artist Tim Man (Kill Bill).

Filming completed in Bangkok, Thailand, in February 2013. In July 2013, Adkins revealed on his Facebook page that the film has officially been titled Ninja: Shadow of a Tear. The film was released on DVD and Blu-ray on December 31, 2013.
