= Ninja: Shadow of a Tear =

2013 American martial arts film

- Official poster
- Directed by: Isaac Florentine
- Written by: Boaz Davidson (as David White)
- Produced by: Boaz Davidson; Frank DeMartini; Tom Waller
- Starring: Scott Adkins; Kane Kosugi; Mika Hijii; Shun Sugata
- Cinematography: Ross W. Clarkson
- Edited by: Irit Raz
- Music by: Logan Mader; Agung Gede; Gerard Marino
- Production companies: Nu Image; Swingin' Productions
- Distributed by: Millennium Films
- Release date: 20 September 2013 (Fantastic Fest)
- Running time: 95 minutes
- Country: United States
- Languages: English; Japanese
- Box office: $544,853

Ninja: Shadow of a Tear (also known as Ninja II) is an American action thriller film directed by Isaac Florentine and starring Scott Adkins, Kane Kosugi, Mika Hijii and Shun Sugata. It is the sequel to Florentine's 2009 film Ninja. The film was shot in Bangkok, Thailand, and it had a special pre-release screening at the 2013 Fantastic Fest in Austin, Texas. It was officially released for download through iTunes on December 17, 2013 and for Blu-ray Disc and DVD on December 31.

== Plot ==
Casey has settled down at the Kōga ninja dojo and married Namiko, who is pregnant with their first child. One day, while shopping for a pendant in town, he encounters and fends off two knife-wielding muggers. Later that night, Casey goes grocery shopping, but when he remembers that the muggers took his wallet, he rushes home only to find Namiko slain, with markings of a barbed wire weapon around her neck. On the day of the funeral, the dojo is visited by a former student named Nakabara, who offers Casey to train at his dojo in Thailand to ease his pain, but Casey declines the offer. Remembering the fighting style of the muggers he encountered, Casey heads to the Azuma dojo to find out their whereabouts before ambushing and killing them in a dark alley.

Days later, Casey takes Nakabara's advice and travels to Bangkok. While sparring with Lucas, one of Nakabara's students, Casey suddenly loses his temper and assaults him with a bokken. Nakabara reminds him to control his emotions by having him undergo the fire walk practice, but Casey stops halfway through the walk due to memories of Namiko lingering in his mind. He goes on a drinking binge at a nearby bar and gets into a fight with several drunk patrons. The next morning, Lucas is killed by the same barbed wire weapon used on Namiko. Nakabara reveals to Casey that his father and Sensei Takeda (Namiko's father), along with a man from Nagoya named Isamu, were the three top students of the Kōga dojo. When their sensei died, Isamu challenged Takeda for control of the dojo; Takeda killed Isamu in the fight and continued as sōke. Isamu's younger brother Goro witnessed the fight and swore to avenge his death, even if it took three generations. Years later, Goro became head of one of the largest drug cartels in Myanmar. Nakabara urges Casey to return to the United States, as being Takeda's son-in-law makes him one of Goro's targets. Instead, Casey asks him to help him find Goro. Nakabara gives him an old map of Burma from his father's days in World War II, with markings indicating locations of ninja weapons.

Casey heads to Myanmar, where he befriends an Indian cab driver named Mike. Later that night, he enters a bar and fights a group of drug dealers. He returns to his hotel room to rest, only to find himself arrested by the State Peace and Development Council, who accuse him of being an American spy and torture him. He escapes from his cell and extracts information on Goro's whereabouts from SPDC General Sung before Mike drives him to the jungle. There, Casey finds a cemetery of Japanese soldiers and arms himself with a boxful of ninja weapons buried under a wooden gravemarker with the Nakabara clan symbol. He sneaks into Goro's hideout, setting the complex on fire before facing Goro's right-hand man Myat. The fight ends with Casey stabbing Myat in the heart and breaking his neck. He then squares off against Goro before slashing him in the midsection. In the middle of the fight, Goro wraps his barbed wire manriki around Casey's neck, but Casey uses his strength to free himself and throw Goro to the ground before decapitating him.

Casey returns to Nakabara's dojo, only to discover that Nakabara was the one who murdered Namiko and Lucas. Nakabara is revealed to be a drug lord himself, and he used Casey to wipe out Goro's cartel to monopolize the Southeast Asian drug trade. He then gives Casey the choice to either join him or die. Both men engage in an intense fight until Casey kicks Nakabara through a thin wall, revealing a room full of ancient artifacts. They continue the fight in the room with weapons, with Casey slashing Nakabara in the midsection and Nakabara impaling Casey's left shoulder with his wakizashi. Nakabara lunges toward Casey, but Casey grabs a manriki and wraps it around Nakabara's neck for the kill. Later, Casey reveals Nakabara's true motives to Hiroshi, one of the dojo's students. Knowing that such actions would ruin the dojo's reputation, Hiroshi states the incident never happened and bids Casey farewell. Casey returns to Japan and drops Namiko's pendant in a pond, bringing closure to his loss.

== Cast ==
- Scott Adkins as Casey Bowman
- Kane Kosugi as Nakabara
- Mika Hijii as Namiko Takeda
- Shun Sugata as Goro
- Vithaya Pansringarm as General Sung
- Mukesh Bhatt as Mike
- Jawed El Berni as Lucas
- Futoshi Hashimoto as Toji
- Tim Man as Myat
- Takato Kitamoto as Hiroshi
- Ron Smoorenburg as Dojo Fighter
- Tawatwong Piyacysin as "Iron Man"

== Production ==
In November 2012, Nu Image and Millennium Films announced that Ninja 2 was in production, with Isaac Florentine returning to the director's chair. Fight choreographer Akihiro "Yuji" Noguchi was replaced by Chinese-Swedish martial artist Tim Man (Kill Bill).

Filming completed in Bangkok, Thailand, in February 2013. In July 2013, Adkins announced on his Facebook page announced that the film's title had been changed to what would be the release name, Ninja: Shadow of a Tear.

== Reception ==
Fred Topel of CraveOnline gave the film a rating of 7.5 out of 10, citing that it is "loaded with fights: really awesome work whether Casey is sparring, picking fights in a rage or actually going up against bad guys. Hollywood movies don’t give you this much value."
