= Softly (Leah Dizon song) =

Single by Leah Dizon

from the album Destiny Line
- B-side: Everything Anything; Without your Love (Normal Edition); Fever (Kylie Minogue cover song) (Limited Edition)
- Released: February 14, 2007
- Genre: J-pop
- Label: Victor Entertainment

Leah Dizon singles chronology
"Fever (Kylie Minogue cover song)" (2006)	"Softly" (2007)	"恋しよう♪" (2007)

Alternative cover
- CD + DVD cover

"Softly" is the debut single of J-pop singer, Leah Dizon. It was released on February 14, 2007, the same day she released her second photobook Hello! Leah. The single fared moderately on the Oricon Charts, yet was quite a success for a debut single and has sold 48,554 copies to date.

== Normal edition track listing ==
1. Softly
2. Everything Anything
3. Without your Love

== Limited edition track listing ==
1. Softly
2. Everything Anything
3. Fever (Kylie Minogue cover song)

== DVD track listing ==
1. Softly (music video)
2. Everything Anything (music video)

== Live performances ==
- February 24, 2007 – Music Fighter – "Softly"
- February 26, 2007 – Hey! Hey! Hey! Music Champ – "Softly"

== Charts ==
Oricon Sales Chart (Japan)

Release	Chart	Peak position	First week sales	Sales total	Chart run
February 14, 2007	Oricon Daily Singles Chart	5			
February 14, 2007	Oricon Weekly Singles Chart	7	20,058	48,554	4 weeks
February 14, 2007	Oricon Monthly Singles Chart				
February 14, 2007	Oricon Yearly Singles Chart				
