= Love Paradox =

Single by Leah Dizon

from the album Communication!!!
- B-side: "Under the Same Sky"
- Released: March 26, 2008
- Genre: J-pop
- Label: Victor Entertainment
- Songwriter(s): Dizon, Arata, Yuhki Shirai, Philippe-Marc Anquetil, Christopher Lee-Joe, Darren Monson & Thomas Volmer Jensen

Leah Dizon singles chronology
"L・O・V・E U" (2007)	"Love Paradox" (2008)	"Vanilla" (2008)

Alternative cover
- CD + DVD

"Love Paradox" is the 4th single from American born gravure model Leah Dizon. It was released March 26, 2008 and features an "internationally flavored pop upper." It came in two versions just like previous releases, CD only Version and Limited Edition CD+DVD Version. The CD only version was originally said to feature "Love Paradox (Bach Logic Remix)", but later for unknown reasons was removed. The lyrics for "Love Paradox" were created by Leah Dizon, Mika Atata, and Yunki Shori.

== Track listing ==
=== CD track listing ===
1. Love Paradox
2. Under the Same Sky
3. Love Paradox (Instrumental)
4. Under the Same Sky (Instrumental)

=== DVD track listing ===
1. Love Paradox (music video)
2. Making-of footage (video clip)

== Charts ==
Oricon Sales Chart (Japan)

Release	Chart	Peak Position	First Week Sales	Sales Total	Chart Run
March 26, 2008	Oricon Daily Singles Chart	#9			
March 26, 2008	Oricon Weekly Singles Chart	#15	6902	6902	
March 26, 2008	Oricon Monthly Singles Chart				
August 8, 2008	Oricon Yearly Singles Chart				
