= Vanilla (Leah Dizon song) =

Single by Leah Dizon

from the album Communication!!!
- B-side: "LOVE SWEET CANDY"
- Released: June 25, 2008
- Genre: J-pop
- Label: Victor Entertainment
- Songwriters: Dizon, Mika Arata, Ha-J, Yoshihiko Chino

Leah Dizon singles chronology
"Love Paradox" (2008)	"Vanilla" (2008)

CD + DVD
- CD + DVD cover

"Vanilla" is singer-songwriter Leah Dizon's fifth single. It was released on June 25, 2008 and came in a Limited Edition CD+DVD version and a CD-only version which featured the bonus track "悲しみと笑顔の中で". The title track is an up-tempo dance tune "overflowing with R&B taste", while the B-side LOVE SWEET CANDY is a "medium-tempo reggae song."

== Track listing ==
=== CD Track listing ===
1. Vanilla
2. LOVE SWEET CANDY
3. 悲しみと笑顔の中で (Kanashimi to Egao no Naka de; In Sadness and in a Smile) (CD only bonus track)
4. Vanilla (Instrumental)
5. LOVE SWEET CANDY (Instrumental)
6. 悲しみと笑顔の中で (Kanashimi to Egao no Naka de; In Sadness and in a Smile) (Instrumental) (CD only bonus track)

=== DVD track listing ===
1. Vanilla (music video)
2. Making-of footage (video clip)

== Charts ==
Oricon Sales Chart (Japan)

Release	Chart	Peak position	First week sales	Sales total	Chart run
March 26, 2008	Oricon Daily Singles Chart	16			
March 26, 2008	Oricon Weekly Singles Chart	26			
March 26, 2008	Oricon Monthly Singles Chart				
August 8, 2008	Oricon Yearly Singles Chart				
