= Leah Dizon =

American singer and model (1986)

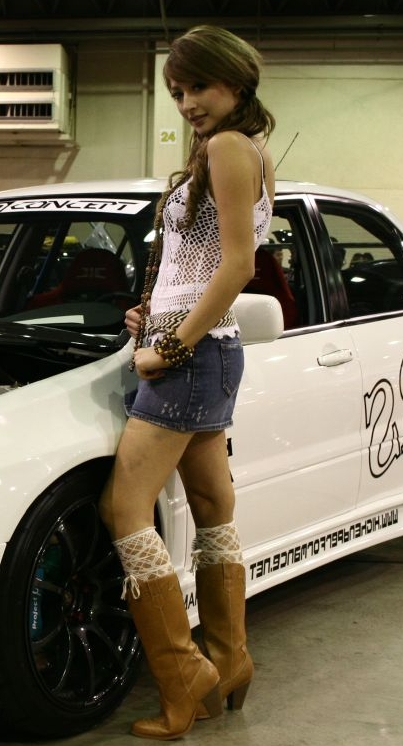
- Dizon at an Oxnard, California car show in 2005
- Born: Leah Donna Dizon; September 24, 1986 (age 39); Las Vegas, Nevada, U.S.
- Education: Nevada State University
- Occupations: Gaijin tarento; singer; model
- Years active: 2006–2010, 2013, 2019
- Labels: Victor Entertainment; Tokyo Rabbit Records
- Spouse: Bun (m. 2008; div. 2010)
- Children: 1

Leah Donna Dizon (born September 24, 1986) is an American former singer, model and media personality. After moving to Japan in early 2006 to pursue an entertainment career, she made her recording debut on Victor Entertainment later that same year.

== Early life and career ==
=== 1986–2004: Childhood and youth ===
Leah Donna Dizon was born in Las Vegas, Nevada, on September 24, 1986. Her mother is of French descent while her father is of Filipino descent. Her parents worked as casino dealers. Dizon is the fourth of six children: she has two older brothers, an older sister, and two younger brothers. In an interview, she explains that she listened to rock and R&B music and trained in dance since the age of 12. Dizon has said that her mother was "very strict and monitored [Dizon's] spending habits". When she was 14 years old, she worked at a clothing store and eventually saved enough money to travel to Japan alone for a trip.

She attended the Las Vegas Academy of Performing Arts for her freshman and sophomore years but graduated from the public Eldorado High School in 2004, where she became active in theater. At the age of 18, Dizon relocated to Los Angeles, California and attended college as a film major for her freshman year.

=== 2005–2007: Destiny Line, early work, and career debut ===
While living in Los Angeles, Dizon worked as a promotional model for local car shows. Eventually, her photographs were posted online. It was reported that there were 2 million Google hits within an entire year, with the majority of the viewers being located in China and Japan. Much of the attention received was attributed to her unique looks. She was asked by many Japanese fans—who had seen her photographs—to work in their country, which eventually prompted her to submit several demo tapes and dance videos to Victor Entertainment. An agent offered and signed her to a recording contract.

In March 2006, Dizon moved to Tokyo and began Japanese lessons alongside voice training. She released her first photobook, Petite Amie (which means "girlfriend" in French), in October 2006—Petite Amie was ranked as the third best-selling photobook of 2006 and 2007. A few pictorials for various magazines followed.

Dizon made her musical debut under Victor Entertainment on February 14, 2007, with the single "Softly". This was followed by "Koi Shiyō", and "L・O・V・E U". which also peaked at number 7 on the Oricon Weekly Chart. The title track is described as a "grooving, up-tempo dance song" and the single features 2 B-sides: "Could you be that one?" and "Aishiteru: Love Story" (アイシテル～ Love Story). Koi Shiyō was used in a Lotte TV advert, while "Could you be that one?" was featured in a PlayStation 3 Ninja Gaiden Sigma TV advert, with Dizon starring in both commercials. In September 2007, Dizon released her debut album, Destiny Line, under Victor Entertainment. The CD+DVD Edition contains 14 tracks, 10 of which she penned herself on the single PVs alongside a special album PV "Again and Again". The CD+1 only edition contains the digitally-released remix of "Koi Shiyō", called "Koi Shiyō (Yasutaka Nakata-Capsule Mix)".

=== 2008–2011: Communication!!!, marriage, and pregnancy ===
After the release of Destiny Line, Dizon continued with two singles: "Love Paradox" and "Vanilla" (both 2008). Her second album, Communication!!!, was released in August 2008. "Under the Same Sky" was used as the theme song for the Japanese drama Tokyo Prom Queen, while "Lost At Sea" was used for season 2. She made a guest appearance on the show as Naomi, the prom queen from the previous year, through photos and video snippets.

In February 2008, Dizon began dating her stylist Bun (b. 1979), whom she had met while shooting the music video for "Love Paradox". On October 10, 2008, three months pregnant, Dizon married Bun in a traditional Japanese ceremony. These initial stages were chronicled and announced during her Communication!!! Album Tour several days after the marriage. The couple's daughter was born in April 2009.

On February 14, 2010, Dizon appeared on live television, claiming that her marriage had been troubled ever since the birth. On October 31, 2010, she announced that she and Bun had separated and filed for divorce earlier that month, and she was seeking full custody of their child. According to Dizon, the split was due to "busy schedules and inability to meet regularly differing opinions toward raising children" alongside "irreconcilable differences". According to a statement released on February 22, 2011, by Dizon's agency, Dizon received full custody of their daughter Mila and details of their arrangement were private. Their divorce was finalized in December 2010. Dizon subsequently attended the Stella Adler Studio of Acting in New York City, where she graduated in December 2012. After graduating, Dizon stated that she would like to return to Japan for work in the future.

In June 2011, Dizon filmed commercials in Manhattan for Shonan Cosmetic Surgery Clinic.

=== 2012–present: Return to Japan ===
On December 14, 2012, Dizon announced that she had signed a contract with a talent agency in the US, and would also be accepting any offers for Japanese work if she were to receive any. The magazine Josei Jishin reported in June 2013 that Dizon's ex-husband Bun had stopped paying child support for their daughter, which was the main reason Dizon returned to Japan, before moving to Las Vegas with her mother and daughter.

As of 2018, Dizon was a senior at Nevada State University, majoring in social psychology, was a McNair Scholar, and had plans to attend graduate school. She graduated magna cum laude in 2019.

== Discography ==
=== Albums ===
List of albums, with selected chart positions
Title	Album details	Peak positions			Sales
Title	Album details	JPN	TWN	TWN East Asian	Sales
Destiny Line	Released: September 12, 2007; Label: Victor; Formats: CD, CD+DVD, digital download	9	10	1	55,091
Communication	Released: August 20, 2008; Label: Victor; Formats: CD, CD+DVD, digital download	16	10	2	14,000

=== Mini-albums ===
List of mini-albums
Title	Album details
For the World	Released: July 24, 2019; Label: Tokyo Rabbit; Format: CD, digital download

=== Singles ===
List of singles, with selected chart positions
Title	Year	Peak chart positions			Sales	Certifications	Album
Title	Year	Oricon Singles Charts	Billboard Japan Hot 100	TWN East Asian	Sales	Certifications	Album
"Fever"	2006	—	—	—	—		Non-album single
"Softly"	2007	7	—	—	49,000		Destiny Line
"Koi Shiyō"	2007	7	—	—	49,000	RIAJ (cellphone): Gold	Destiny Line
"L・O・V・E U"	2007	16	—	—	20,000		Destiny Line
"Love Paradox"	2008	15	30	—	11,000		Communication
"Vanilla"	2008	26	—	7	8,000		Communication
"For The World"	2019	—	—	—	—		FOR THE WORLD
"Only You"	2020	—	—	—	—		Non-album single

=== Concert DVDs ===
- Live Communication!!! (2008)

=== Video game soundtracks ===
- "Everlasting Love + You" (Katamari Forever) (2009)
- "Bomb a Head!" (Samurai & Dragons version ft. Leah Dizon) (Samurai & Dragons) (2013)

== Filmography ==
=== Film ===
- Traffic in the Sky (トラフィック・イン・ザ・スカイ) (2007)
- Kiba Gaiden (呀＜KIBA＞ ～暗黒騎士鎧伝～) (2011)

=== Television ===
- Webtama as a co-host (2007)
- Sakigake Ongaku Banzuke Vegas as host (2007)
- J-Melo as host (2007)

=== Plays ===
- Words Yakusoku / Uragiri: Subete, Ushinawareshi Mono no Tame (2009)
- To Drop Atomic Bombs on Hiroshima (2009)

== See also ==
- Americans in Japan
- Magibon
