= Destiny Line =

Studio album by Leah Dizon
- Released: September 12, 2007
- Genre: J-pop
- Length: 53:45
- Languages: Japanese, English
- Label: Victor Entertainment

Leah Dizon chronology
Destiny Line (2007)	Communication!!! (2008)

CD + DVD
- CD + DVD cover

Singles from Destiny Line
- 1. "Softly" Released: February 14, 2007; 2. "恋しよう♪" Released: May 30, 2007; 3. "L・O・V・E U" Released: August 8, 2007

Destiny Line is the debut studio album by American-born Japanese pop singer Leah Dizon. It was released on September 12, 2007 by Victor Entertainment. Dizon herself also wrote or co-wrote 10 of the tracks.

== Tie-ups and theme songs ==
- "Softly" — was used as the Terebi Tokyo TV show Webtama's ending theme song.
- "恋しよう♪" — was used for a Lotte Rich Fruits Chocolate (Strawberry/Raspberry) TV ad as well as the music.jp CM.
- "Could you be that one?" — was used in the TV ad for the PlayStation 3 game titled Ninja Gaiden Sigma.
- "L・O・V・E U" — was used as the Shueisha magazine PINKY's CM song.
- "Are you feelin' for me?" — was used in the Lotte Rich Fruits Chocolate (European Pear) TV ad.

Dizon starred in all of the ads.

== Music videos ==
There are a total of 5 music videos (also known as PVs) on the album. They are "Softly", "Everything Anything", "Koi Shiyō♪", "L・O・V・E U", and "Again and Again". The DVD edition also comes with an exclusive interview with Dizon and a behind the scenes look of the album titled "Real Peek". "Again and Again" is a special album PV. It was used to promote the album.

== CD track listing ==
#	Title	Songwriters	
1.	"Impossible"	Leah Dizon. Mika Arata	3:24
2.	"Everything Anything"	Himari Michikawa	4:55
3.	"Missing"	Leah Dizon. Mika Arata	5:28
4.	"恋しよう♪" (Koi Shiyō; Let's Love)	Leah Dizon. Mika Arata	4:16
5.	"運命線" (Unmeisen; Destiny Line)	Leah Dizon, Maiko Emura	3:20
6.	"Could You Be That One?"	Leah Dizon, Maiko Emura	3:15
7.	"Are You Feelin’ for Me?"	Leah Dizon	3:09
8.	"Softly"	Kanata Okajima	4:57
9.	"Time (Clock of the Heart)" (Culture Club cover song)	George O’Dowd, Jon Moss, Micheal Craig, Roy Hay	4:18
10.	"アイシテル～Love Story" (Aishiteru; I Love You)	Leah Dizon	3:41
11.	"Wonderlin'"	Nao Tanaka	3:15
12.	"L・O・V・E U"	Leah Dizon. Mika Arata	4:19
13.	"Drive Me Crazy"	Leah Dizon. Mika Arata	3:18
14.	"Again and Again"	Leah Dizon	4:10
15.	[CD-only Bonus Track] Koi Shiyō♪ (yasutaka nakata-capsule mix)	Leah Dizon. Mika Arata	6:18

== DVD track listing ==
#	Title
1.	"Softly" <PV>
2.	"Everything Anything” <PV>
3.	"恋しよう♪" (Koi Shiyou♪; Let's Love) <PV>
4.	" L.o.v.e U" <PV>
5.	"Again and Again" <PV>
6.	"Real Peek" Off-Shot Footage <video clip>

== Oricon sales charts (Japan) ==
Oricon Albums Chart
Release	Chart	Peak position	First week sales	Sales total	Chart run
September 12, 2007	Oricon Daily Albums Chart	4			
September 12, 2007	Oricon Weekly Albums Chart	9	27,502	55,091	9 weeks
September 12, 2007	Oricon Monthly Albums Chart				
September 12, 2007	Oricon Yearly Albums Chart				

Oricon Singles Chart
Release	Single	Chart	Peak position
February 14, 2007	"Softly"	Oricon Daily Singles Chart	5
February 14, 2007	"Softly"	Oricon Weekly Singles Chart	7
May 30, 2007	"Koi Shiyō♪"	Oricon Daily Singles Chart	5
May 30, 2007	"Koi Shiyō♪"	Oricon Weekly Singles Chart	7
August 8, 2007	"L.o.v.e U"	Oricon Daily Singles Chart	11
August 8, 2007	"L.o.v.e U"	Oricon Weekly Singles Chart	16
