= Communication!!! =

Studio album by Leah Dizon
- Released: August 20, 2008
- Genre: J-pop
- Length: 47:24
- Languages: Japanese, English
- Label: Victor Entertainment

Leah Dizon chronology
Destiny Line (2007)	Communication!!! (2008)

CD + DVD
- CD + DVD cover

Singles from Communication!!!
- 1. "Love Paradox" Released: March 26, 2008; 2. "Vanilla" Released: June 25, 2008

Communication!!! is the second studio album by American-born Japanese pop singer Leah Dizon. It was released on August 20, 2008, by Victor Entertainment. Dizon herself also wrote or co-wrote 10 of the tracks, along with composing 2 herself. It was released in a CD-only and CD + DVD format and it includes the title tracks from her two latest singles, Love Paradox and Vanilla, as well as two b-sides.

According to one press release, Lost At Sea and BxKxRxxx' are said to be rock tunes, "her first".

It is Dizon's last recording before announcing her marriage and pregnancy in October 2008 on her Communication!!! Album Tour several days after the wedding.

== CD track listing ==
No.	Title	Writer(s)	Arranger(s)	Length
1.	"Step Into My World"	Leah Dizon, Mika Arata, Kōtarō Egami	Ha-J	4:32
2.	"Love Paradox"	Dizon, Arata, Yuhki Shirai, Philippe-Marc Anquetil & Christopher Lee-Joe & Darren Monson & Thomas Volmer Jensen	BNA Productions	3:36
3.	"Love Sweet Candy"	Dizon, Arata, Shirai, Kana	Atoshi Hidaka	3:25
4.	"Without a Good-Bye"	Dizon, Shirai, Anquetil & Karl Guner & Hanne Sørvaag	BNA Productions, Karl Guner	3:30
5.	"Vanilla"	Dizon, Arata, Ha-J, Yoshihiko Chino	Ha-J	4:05
6.	"Nothin' to Lose"	Dizon, Hiro	Hiro	3:33
7.	"Lost at Sea"	Dizon, Chino	Chino	5:23
8.	"Communication!!!"	Leah Dizon, Yoshiaki Fujizawa	Fujizawa	3:43
9.	"Not Too Bad"	Hiro	Hiro	3:51
10.	"BxKxRxxx"	Shirai, Dizon, Chino	Ha-J, Chino	3:51
11.	"Under the Same Sky"	Dizon, Arata, Shirai, Hisashi Nawata, Emi Miyamoto	Hisashi Nawata	3:54
12.	"Thank You"	Dizon, Shirai, STY	STY	4:01

=== DVD Track listing ===
No.	Title	Length
1.	"Under the Same Sky (music video)"
2.	"Under the Same Sky (Tokyo Prom Queen Version)"
3.	"Under the Same Sky (making video)"
4.	"Vanilla (music video)"
5.	"Sweet Vanilla Shot!"
6.	"Love Paradox (music video)"
7.	"Hong Kong Tour Live & Off Leah's Cut"
