= Koi Shiyō =

Single by Leah Dizon

from the album Destiny Line
- B-side: Could you be that one?; Aishiteru Love Story
- Released: May 30, 2007
- Genre: J-pop
- Label: Victor Entertainment
- Songwriter: Leah Dizon. Mika Arata

Leah Dizon singles chronology
"Softly" (2007)	"Koi Shiyō" (2007)	"L・O・V・E U" (2007)

CD + DVD
- CD + DVD cover

"Koi Shiyō" (恋しよう) is the second single by J-pop singer Leah Dizon. It was released on May 30, 2007. The regular edition includes a bonus sixfold mini-poster, while the Limited Edition includes a bonus DVD which contains a music video, and making-of footage. To promote the single, the song "Could you be that one?" was featured in the Tecmo commercial for Ninja Gaiden Sigma.

== Track listing ==
1. "Koi Shiyō" (恋しよう; Let's Fall in Love)
2. "Could you be that one?"
3. "Aishiteru Love Story" (アイシテル～ Love Story; I Love You)

== DVD track listing ==
1. "Koi Shiyō" (恋しよう; Let's Fall in Love) (promo video)
2. Making-of Footage (video clip)

== Charts ==
Chart	Peak position
Oricon Weekly Singles Chart	7
Oricon Monthly Singles Chart	15
RIAJ Digital Track Chart	10

=== Sales and certifications ===
Chart	Amount
Oricon physical sales	49,251
RIAJ full-length cellphone downloads	Gold (100,000+)
