= Mika Hijii =

Japanese actress and gravure idol (born 1982)

- 肘井 ミカ
- Born: 肘井 美佳 (Hijii Mika); October 13, 1982 (age 43); Iizuka, Fukuoka Prefecture, Japan
- Other name: Mikaringo (みかりんご)
- Years active: 2001–present
- Spouse: Unknown (m. 2019)
- Children: 2
- Modeling information
- Height: 1.59 m (5 ft 2 1/2 in)
- Hair color: Black
- Eye color: Black
- Agency: Stardust Promotion
- Website: Official profile

Mika Hijii (肘井 ミカ, Hijii Mika; born 肘井 美佳, October 13, 1982 in Fukuoka Prefecture, Japan) is a Japanese actress and gravure idol best known for her role as Kaoru Mitsuki in the Garo series. She is also known in the western world for her role as Namiko Takeda in the 2009 martial arts film Ninja and its 2013 sequel Ninja: Shadow of a Tear. Mika Hijii is affiliated with Stardust Promotion. She holds a bachelor's degree in business administration from Hosei University.

Hijii is an avid practitioner of Kung fu. In 2011, she participated in the team division of the 28th All Japan Wushu Tai Chi Championship. She and Yayoi Kumada, a stunt actress whose work includes Garo, placed fourth.

Hijii speaks fluent English. She studied abroad in New York City from July 2013 to January 2014 and has appeared in English-language education programs on NHK. She has also worked as a reporter for English-language outlets.

In 2019, she married a man who is not in the entertainment industry. The marriage was timed to coincide with the start of Japan's Reiwa era. She wrote on social media that she and her husband wanted to “cherish the joy of being able to build a relationship in a new way in the beginning of the new generation.”

In June 2020, she changed her stage name, spelling her given name in phonetic katakana rather than kanji.

== Filmography ==
=== TV Drama ===
- Doll House (2004)
- Kamen Rider Blade (2004) as Miyuki Yoshinaga/Orchid Undead (eps. 20–25)
- Soleá of Love as Tomoko Tadokoro (2004)
- Garo (2005) as Kaoru Mitsuki
- Fukuoka Ren'ai wa Kusho (2006)
- Garo Special: Byakuya no Maju (2006) as Kaoru Mitsuki
- Kin'iru no Tsubasa (2007)
- Aibō (2010) as Natsuki Nanjo (season 8 ep. 11)
- Arienai! (2010) as Saya (ep. 10)
- Tokyo Little Love (2010) as Misaki Nakajima
- Kudo Shinichi he no Chosenjo (2011) as Kaori Kisaragi (ep. 5)
- Garo: Makai Senki (2011) as Kaoru Mitsuki
- Taburakashi -Daigō Joyū-gyō Maki- (2012) as Saori (ep. 2)
- Mikeneko Hōmuzu no Suiri (2012) as Yukari Fujita
- Otona no Kiso Eigo (2012-2015) as herself

=== Films ===
- Chicken Is Barefoot (2004) as Naoko Sakurai
- Cherry Pie (2006) as Chiharu Kinoshita
- Bokura no Hōteishiki (2008)
- Happy Flight (2008) as Shiori Nakajima
- Rogue Ninja (2009) as Ukagami
- Ninja (2009) as Namiko Takeda
- Time Traveller: The Girl Who Leapt Through Time (2010) as Nurse
- Garo: Red Requiem (2010) as Karma (voice only)
- Alien vs Ninja (2010) as Rin
- Cheerfu11y (2011) as Rin Ishikawa
- Ninja: Shadow of a Tear (2013) as Namiko Takeda

=== V-Cinema ===
- Kiba Gaiden (2011) as Kaoru Mitsuki/Messiah
