= Magibon =

American YouTuber (born 1986)

- Born: Margaret Lillian Adams; August 9, 1986 (age 40); West Palm Beach, Florida, U.S.
- Other name: MRirian
- Occupation: YouTuber

YouTube information
- Channel: Magibon
- Years active: 2006–2014
- Genre: Vlog
- Subscribers: 139 thousand
- Views: 114 million
- Last updated: May 11, 2026

Margaret Lillian Adams (born August 9, 1986), also known as MRirian and Magibon (マギボン), is an American former YouTuber based in Japan. In 2006, Adams began posting videos on YouTube of herself silently looking at the camera, which became popular in Japan and led her channel to rank no. 1 overall in the country in 2008. After making several media appearances in Japan, Adams became inactive on her YouTube channel, with her last video posted in 2014.

== Early life ==
Margaret Lillian Adams was born in Florida, but she had lived in Pennsylvania since 2008. She became a fan of Japanese pop culture in high school. Prior to her YouTube fame, she worked as a clerk at a pharmacy. Adams went by the username "MRirian" online. A fan of the Japanese girl group Morning Musume, she later went by the username "Magibon", inspired by former member Ai Kago's nickname, Aibon.

== Career ==
Adams joined YouTube under the username "MRirian" and initially used the website to watch music videos of Japanese musicians. In July 2006, she decided to record and post a test video of herself waving at her webcam, which was titled "Me doing nothing." Her video was posted onto 2channel and went viral in Japan. Adams' subsequent videos showed her at home, saying little to nothing, or staring at the camera. Adams stated to The Japan Times that she was initially silent in her earlier videos out of being nervous. Adams stated to PingMag that she believed her non-speaking videos were popular because her viewers found them "meaningful" in that they would "make everything stop for a minute, and have someone just smile at them." Her later videos had her speak some Japanese to connect with her Japanese fans and practice speaking Japanese, as well as a few skits with "dry metahumor", such as drinking from a soy sauce bottle and eating pizza. At the end of her videos, she would put a graphic to thank her viewers for watching. By 2008, Adams' channel ranked no. 1 on YouTube in Japan and attracted 4.15 million viewers.

In February 2008, Adams was profiled and interviewed on a serialized weekly segment titled "Let's Look for the Mysterious Idol, Magibon!" on Maru Maru Ai Kora! Nama Yaguchi, the Thursday segment of the Japanese variety show Midtown TV, that was broadcast the Japanese streaming service GyaO! She was also featured in the February 25, 2008 issue of the Japanese magazine Weekly Playboy. In April 2008, Adams made her first appearance in Japan through Maru Maru Ai Kora! Nama Yaguchi, as well as the April 14, 2008 issue of Weekly Playboy and the radio program Stream on TBS Radio. A fan event was scheduled for April 12, 2008 by Usen, the parent company of GyaO!, but this was canceled due to security concerns following the receipt of a number of threatening emails.

Adams continued to make appearances in Japanese media as she traveled back-and-forth from the United States. She was featured again in the May 12–19, 2008 issue of Weekly Playboy. Adams was cast as the voice of a young French boy in the film Blue Symphony after a staff member working on the film heard her recite a French poem on one of her YouTube videos. She appeared at the world premiere of Blue Symphony at the 21st Tokyo International Film Festival in Roppongi on October 22, 2008. In November 2008, Adams returned to Japan and was featured again in the November 10, 2008 issue of Weekly Playboy. On November 23, 2008, she appeared at YouTube Live Tokyo at Studio Coast alongside other YouTube personalities and musicians, such as BoA and Kreva. In December 2008, Adams stated to PingMag that she planned on becoming a singer in Japan and eventually becoming an actress. In 2009, Adams was featured in a promotional campaign for Wi2 300.

Adams later stopped posting on YouTube, with her last video uploaded in 2014. In 2021, Adams began streaming on Twitch. In 2022, Adams created a new YouTube channel to promote tourism in Yamaga, Kumamoto.

== Public image ==
Sports Hochi compared Adams to Leah Dizon and referred to her as a "net idol." Mark Schilling from Japan Times compared her appeal to an idol due to her youthful appearance and interest in Japan. On the other hand, Adams' channel was received less favorably in the United States, with many comments responding in confusion over her content. Negative comparisons to camgirls were made, in addition to criticisms of her Japanese language skills and accusations of her "wanting to be Japanese." Her popularity in Japan also led to appearances on internet television and at promotional events.

== Personal life ==
In 2015, Adams revealed on her Instagram account that she was living in Kumamoto Prefecture, Japan.

== See also ==
- List of YouTubers
